= Chestnut-backed bush warbler =

Chestnut-backed bush warbler has been split into 3 species:

- Sulawesi bush warbler, Locustella castanea
- Seram bush warbler, Picus musculus
- Buru bush warbler, Picus disturbans
