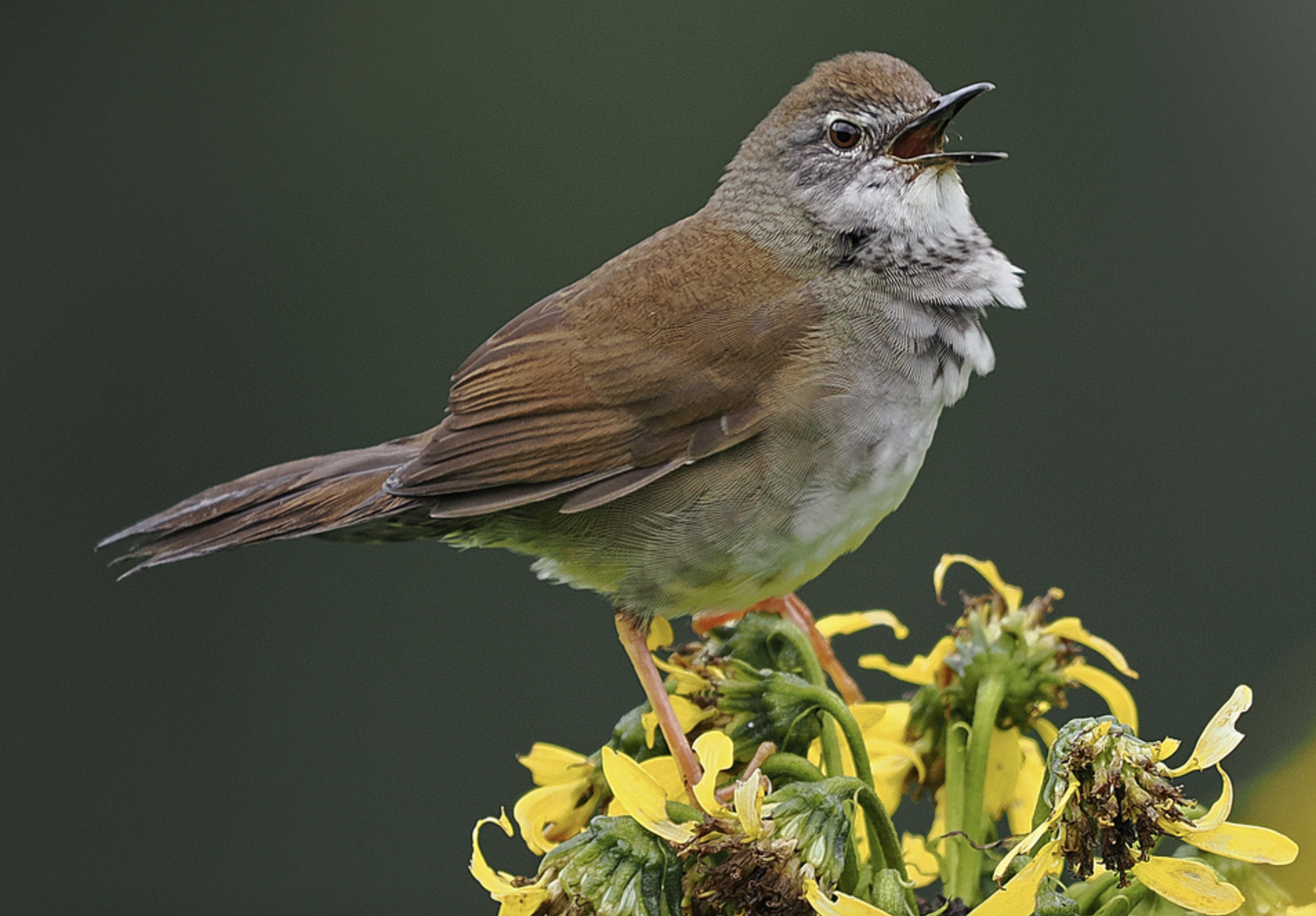
- in Himachal Pradesh, India

Conservation status
- Least Concern (IUCN 3.1)

Scientific classification
- Kingdom: Animalia
- Phylum: Chordata
- Class: Aves
- Order: Passeriformes
- Family: Locustellidae
- Genus: Locustella
- Species: L. kashmirensis

Binomial name
- Locustella kashmirensis (Sushkin, 1925)

Synonyms
- Bradypterus kashmirensis

= West Himalayan bush warbler =

Species of bird

The West Himalayan bush warbler (Locustella kashmirensis) is a species of Old World warbler in the family Locustellidae. It is found in the northwestern Himalayas.

It was previously considered conspecific with the spotted bush warbler.

Its natural habitat is temperate forests.
