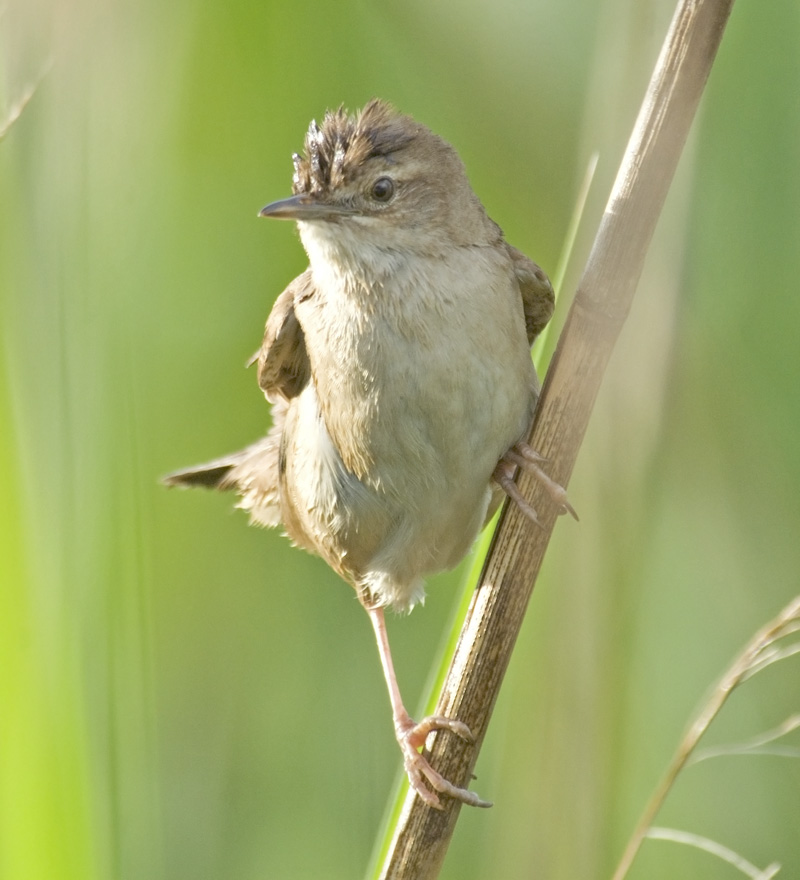

Conservation status
- Least Concern (IUCN 3.1)

Scientific classification
- Kingdom: Animalia
- Phylum: Chordata
- Class: Aves
- Order: Passeriformes
- Family: Locustellidae
- Genus: Locustella
- Species: L. luscinioides

Binomial name
- Locustella luscinioides (Savi, 1824)
- Range of L. luscinioides Breeding Passage Non-breeding

Audio
- Song

= Savi's warbler =

Species of bird

Savi's warbler (Locustella luscinioides) is a species of Old World warbler in the genus Locustella. It breeds in Europe and the western Palearctic. It is migratory, wintering in northern and sub-Saharan Africa.

This small passerine bird is found in reed beds, usually with some bushes. Three to six eggs are laid in a nest in reeds. The adult has an unstreaked grey-brown back, whitish grey underparts and a lack of throat streaks, which is a distinction from the river warbler. The sexes are identical, as with most warblers, but young birds are yellower below. Like most warblers, it is insectivorous. This is not a shy species, but can be difficult to see in the reeds except sometimes when singing.

The song is a monotonous mechanical insect-like reeling, often given at dusk. It is similar to the song of other species in the group, but is generally faster and deeper and bears a strong resemblance to that of Roesel's bush-cricket.

== Taxonomy ==
The common name of this bird recognises the Italian ornithologist Paolo Savi, the author of "Ornitologia Toscana" (1827–1831) and "Ornitologia Italiana" (1873–1876). In 1821, Savi was given specimens of an unstreaked, dark, rufous-brown warbler which was new to science. He published a full description of the bird in 1824, and it became known by the common name of Savi's warbler. The genus name Locustella is from Latin and is a diminutive of locusta, "grasshopper". This refers to the song of the common grasshopper warbler and some others in this genus. The specific luscinioides is from Latin luscinia, "nightingale", and Ancient Greek -oides, "resembling".

It forms a species pair with the river warbler, Locustella fluviatilis, and studies of mitochondrial DNA show that both are closely related to the lanceolated warbler, L. lanceolata, and the common grasshopper warbler, L. naevia.

There are three subspecies. Locustella luscinioides luscinioides is the nominate subspecies which is native to Central and Eastern Europe, Spain, Portugal and North Africa. It winters in West Africa in an area stretching from Senegal to Lake Chad and northern Ghana, and probably also in South Sudan. L. l. sarmatica is native to Ukraine, the Sea of Azov, the Volga region and the Urals; it winters in Northeastern Africa. L. l. fusca is found from Jordan and Turkey as far east as central Asia; it winters in Sudan and Ethiopia.

== Description ==
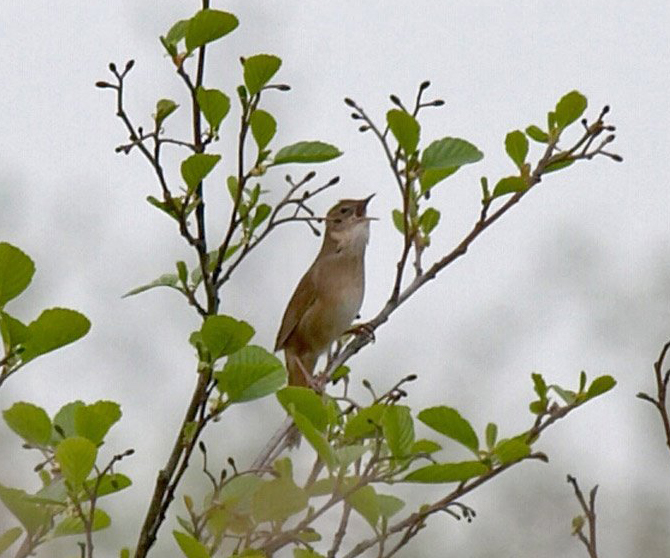
Singing from an alder tree

The upper-parts of Savi's warbler are a uniform dark reddish-brown, sometimes with a slight greenish tinge. It has indistinct buff eye-stripes, dark lores and pale brown ear-coverts. The brown beak is slender and the irises are also brown. The chin, throat and belly are whitish-buff and the rest of the underparts sandy brown. In the breeding season, both upper-parts and underparts are slightly paler. The legs are brown. The bird is around 14 cm (5.5 in) long.

The song is a trill very similar to that of the grasshopper warbler but slightly lower pitched and less prolonged. It is often preceded by a series of low ticks which gradually merge into the trill. The bird sings from high on a reed head with open beak and vibrating throat. Both males and females sing.

== Behaviour ==
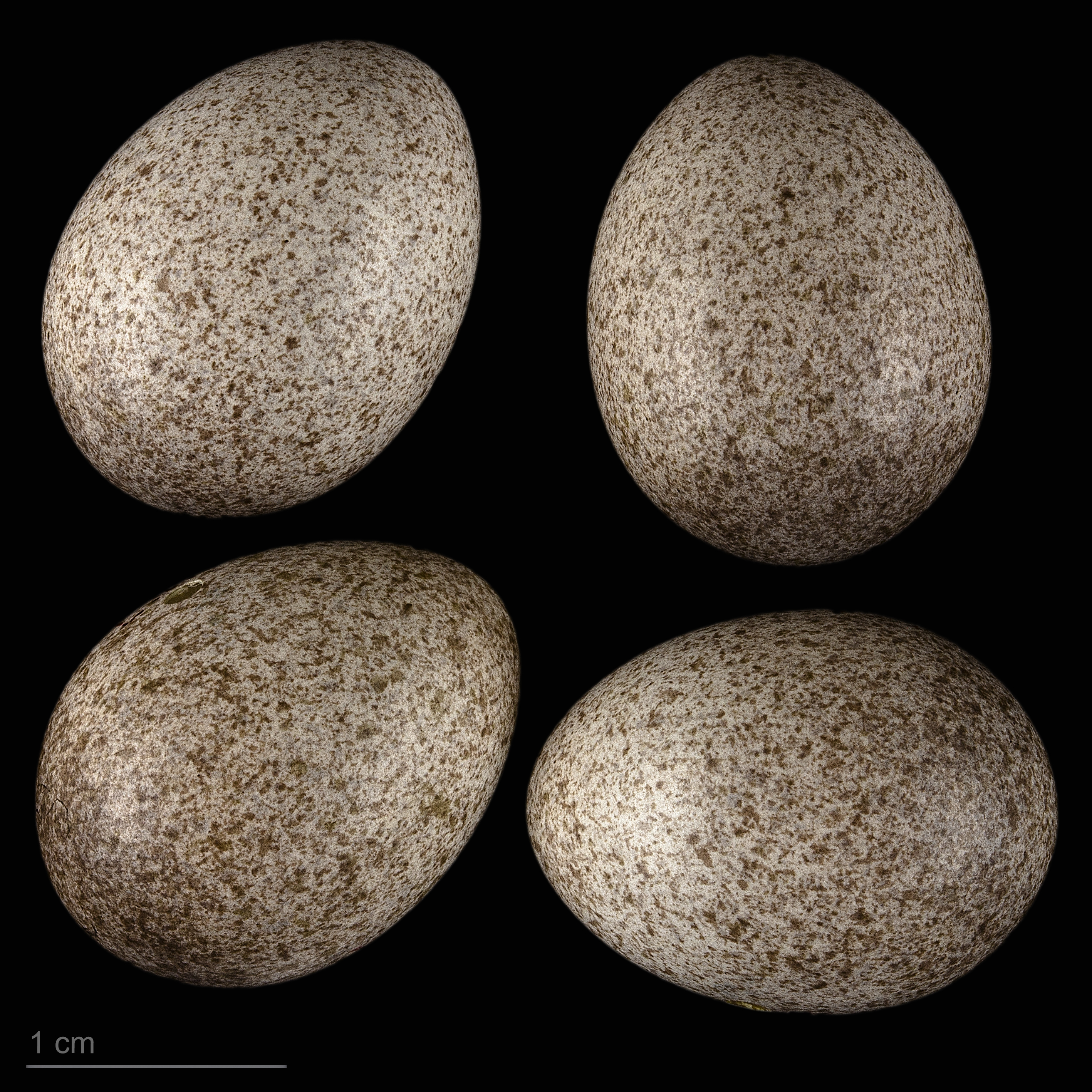
Locustella luscinioides - MHNT

Savi's warbler moults into its breeding plumage before returning to its summer range. On arrival at the wetlands, the birds flit among the reeds and undergrowth and are seldom seen, but on establishing territories, they climb to the top of reeds and sing from prominent positions. They feed on insects such as flies, beetles, moths, grubs and damselflies. Small worms are also believed to be taken. After breeding the birds disperse somewhat to less densely vegetated fens, moult into their winter plumage and depart on their migration. Little is known of their habits in their winter quarters but they occupy similar swampy areas, have been seen in cornfields and may feed and roost in small flocks.

== Breeding ==
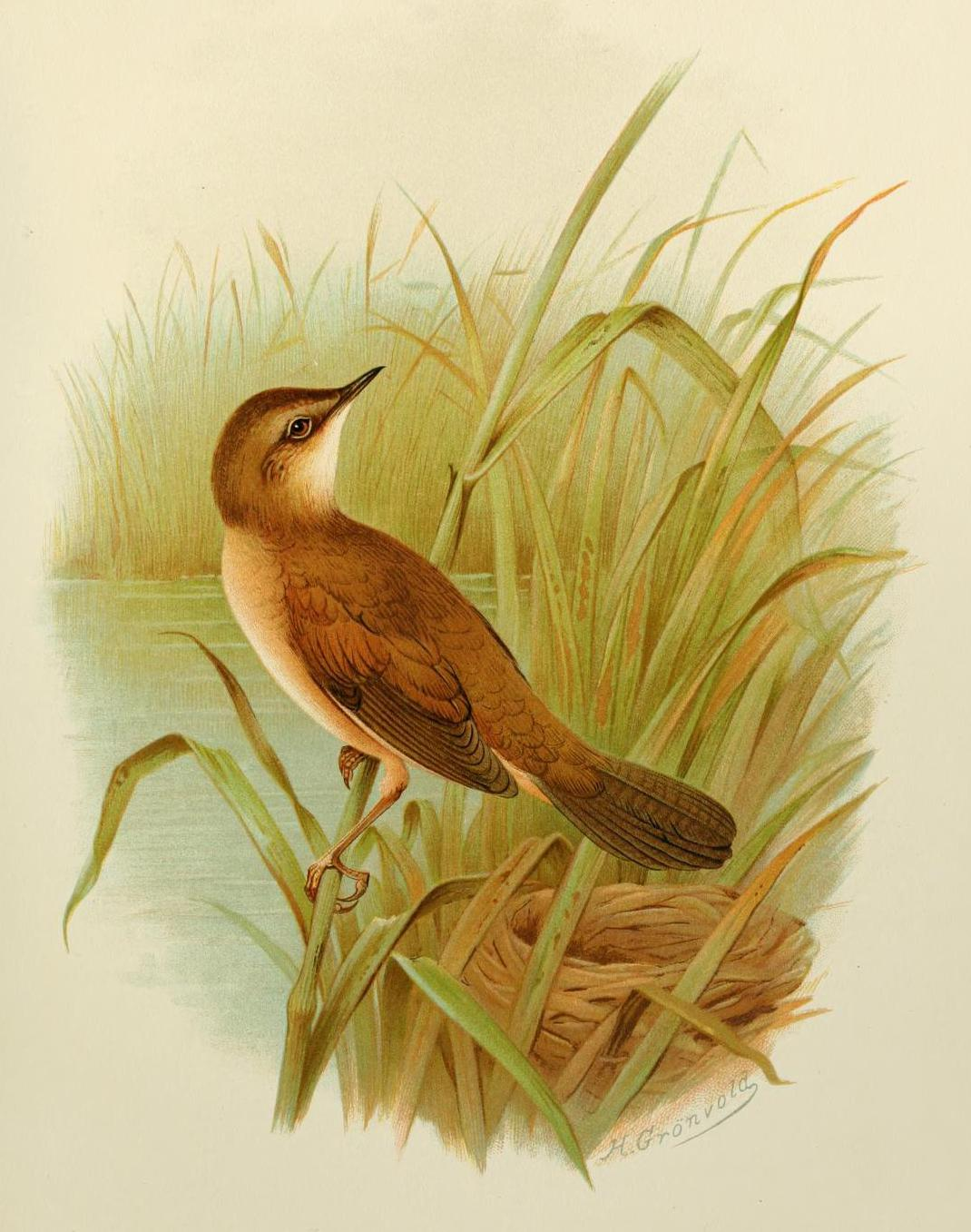
Adult with nest

Locustella luscinioides

The breeding season for Savi's warbler starts in mid-April in the southern part of its range and at the end of May in Northern Europe. The first males to arrive take up occupation of the best territories, which are judged by the density of the reeds and sedges. As the females arrive, they successively pair with the males with the best territories. Late arrivals have poorer quality territories and their breeding success is impaired, usually because fewer clutches are successfully reared. The nest is built by the female on a little reed platform in the manner of a moorhen's nest and is well concealed among dead reeds and clumps of vegetation. It is often made from leaves of Glyceria but some nests instead are neatly lined with fine grasses and leaves. It is not usually visible from above. Four to six (occasionally three) eggs are laid. They are greyish-white, liberally speckled with greyish rusty-coloured spots, sometimes in a darker band round the egg. They measure about 19.5 by 14.5 mm (0.77 by 0.57 in). Incubation lasts for about twelve days and is done exclusively by the female. She also feeds the chicks when they first hatch with the male joining in as they grow. The young fledge in about twelve days and there are normally two broods.

== Distribution and habitat ==
Savi's warbler breeds in Algeria, Spain, Mallorca, France, Sicily, Crete, Italy, Netherlands, Germany, Poland, Romania, Bulgaria, Albania, Croatia, Slovenia, Serbia, Jordan, Turkey and Russia as far east as the River Volga. It winters in Algeria, Morocco, Sudan and Ethiopia. It is known as an occasional visitor to the United Kingdom (where a few pairs breed sporadically), Ireland, Belgium, Switzerland, Corsica, Sardinia, Malta, Cyprus and Israel.

Savi's warbler is to be found in reed beds, marshes and lagoons with reeds, sedges and other marsh vegetation, perhaps with scattered sallows or bushes. It climbs stems in order to sing in full view but is otherwise difficult to see as it flits with agility through the stems and tangled growth and is seldom seen on open ground. It occupies similar habitats in its winter quarters but may also be found in fens or marshy locations with open water away from reeds.

== Status ==
Savi's warbler is assessed by the IUCN in their Red List of Threatened Species as being of least concern. This is because it has a large total population and an extensive range. The population in Europe is estimated to be between 530 and 800 thousand breeding pairs with a total of 1.6 to 2.4 million individuals. As Europe amounts to about two thirds of its total range, the world population may be in the region of 2.1 to 4.8 million individuals. Numbers of birds may be decreasing somewhat but not to the extent that would warrant listing Savi's warbler under a higher risk category.
