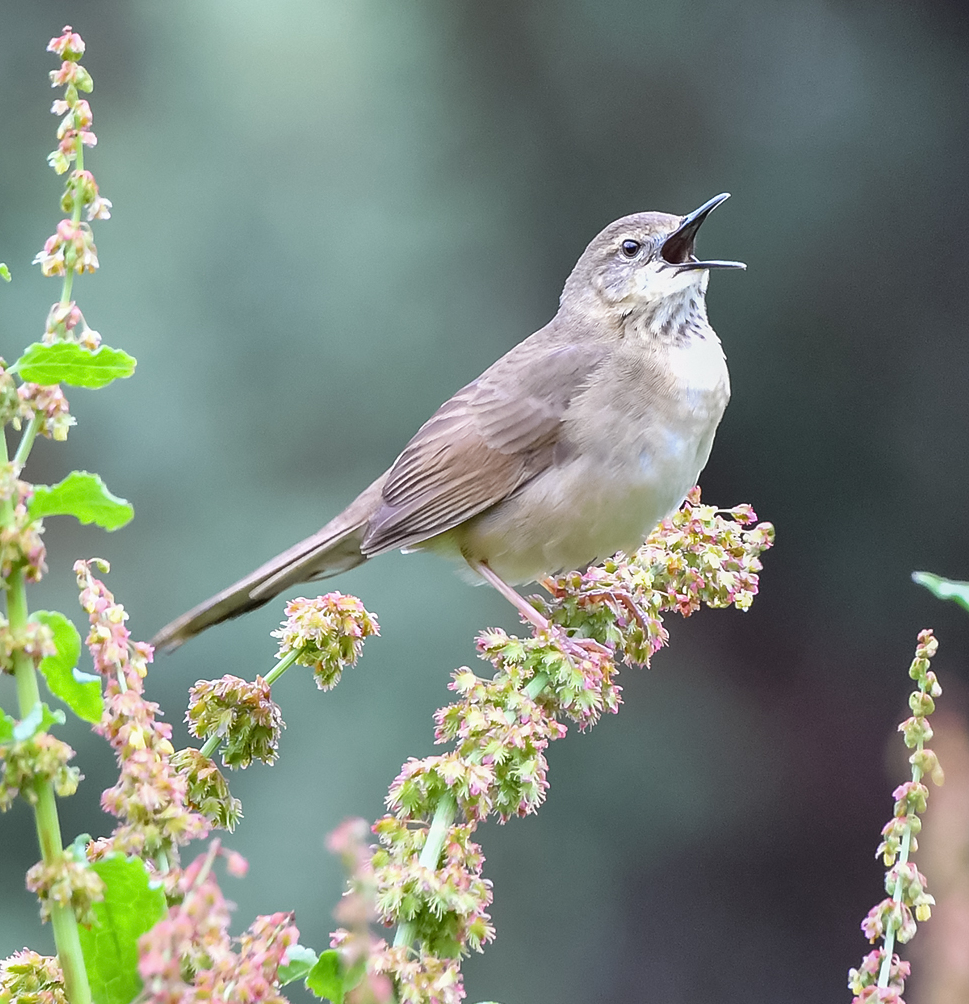
- Long-billed bush warbler singing in Gilgit, Pakistan

Conservation status
- Endangered (IUCN 3.1)

Scientific classification
- Kingdom: Animalia
- Phylum: Chordata
- Class: Aves
- Order: Passeriformes
- Family: Locustellidae
- Genus: Locustella
- Species: L. major

Binomial name
- Locustella major (Brooks, 1871)

Synonyms
- Bradypterus major; Dumeticola major; Tribura major

= Long-billed bush warbler =

Species of bird

The long-billed bush warbler (Locustella major) is a rare species of Old World warbler in the family Locustellidae. It is found in China, India, Pakistan, and Tajikistan. It is also known as the long-billed grasshopper warbler.

== Taxonomy ==
The Long-billed bush warbler was described by Irish ornithologist William Edwin Brooks in 1871 with the given type locality of "Kashmir". He gave it the name Dumeticola major, with Dumeticola meaning inhabiting thickets, owing to the habitat of the bird and major being a reference to it being larger than the Baikal bush warbler (then under the name Dumeticola affinis). It was later placed in the genus Locustella, which is a reference to the locust-like call of the birds in the genus. There are currently two recognized subspecies:

- L. m. major - (Brooks, 1871): Found in the Himalayas from Tajikistan through Pakistan into Kashmir
- L. m. innae - (Leonid Portenko, 1955): The Kunlun Mountains in Xinjiang, China

== Description ==
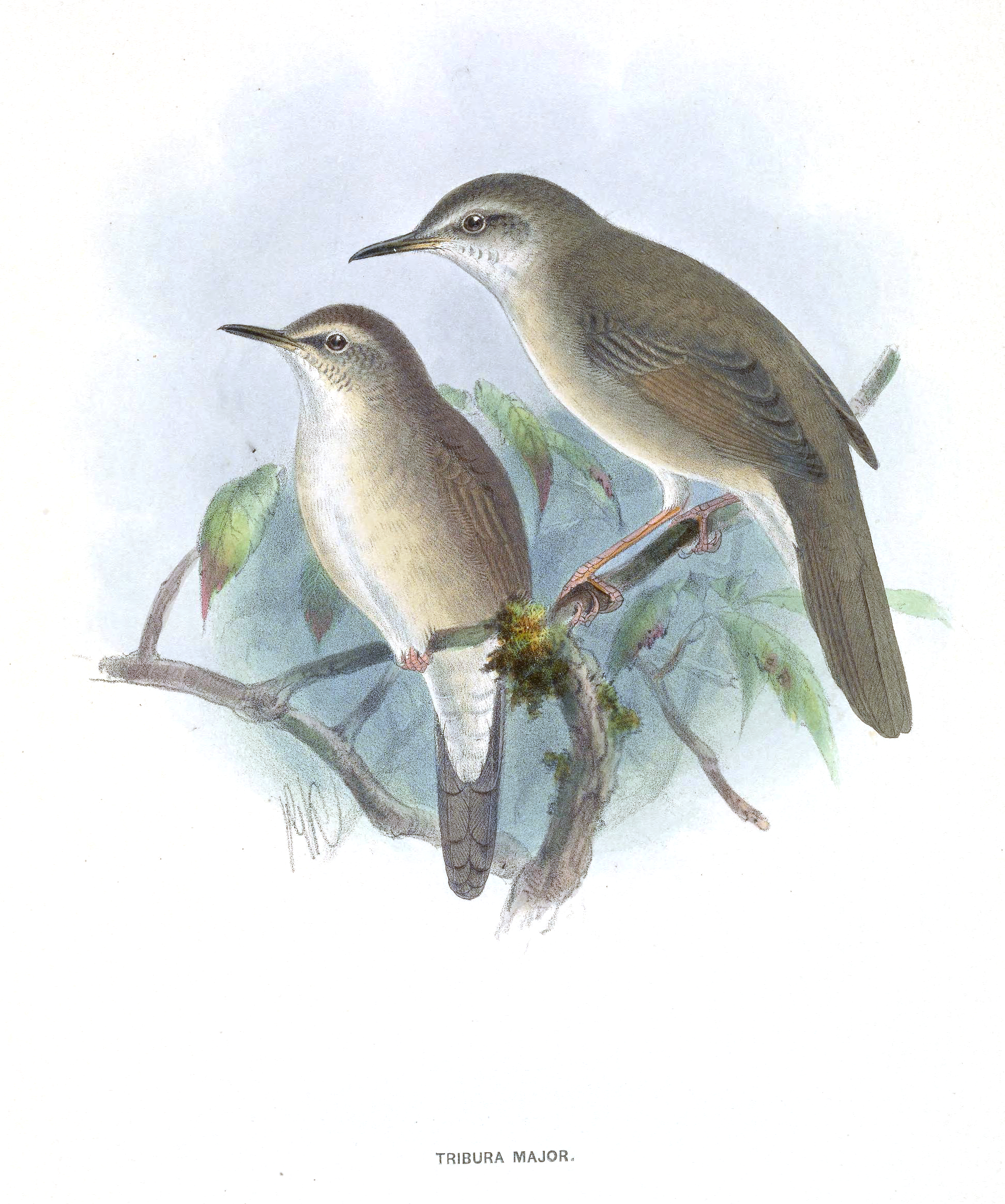
Illustration by J. G. Keulemans (1891)

The Long-billed bush warbler is a small brown bird with pink legs, a relatively long black bill and brown eyes. Its body is brown with a pale breast, throat, and supercilium. Its song is a repetitive clicking noise similar to that of grasshopper but less buzzy.

== Distribution ==
It is found in two disjunct populations, one (L. m. major) occurs in Tajikistan, Pakistan, Ladakh, and Kashmir. The other (L. m. innae) is found in the Kunlun Mountains in central Xinjiang, China. There are unconfirmed reports from Uzbekistan.

== Status ==
The Long-billed bush warbler is a very rare bird, partly owing to its remote habitat and its skulky behaviour. Early sources indicate that the Long-billed bush warbler was a common bird, with some sources even saying it was abundant. However, since the mid 20th century there have been multiple year gaps between sightings and previously common sites have been found absent of the bird entirely. The warbler seems to be more easily found in its distribution in Pakistan. The subspecies L. m. innae hasn't been recorded since its type specimens were taken in 1874, with a multiple month survey in 2003 failing to find any. The IUCN Red List classifies it as Near threatened, with threats including habitat loss and changing agricultural practices. Overgrazing, particularly in Kashmir has led to the near disappearance of the Long-billed bush warbler's ideal habitat, that being areas of long grass and thickets with a dense understory.
