= Chinese warbler =

Chinese warbler may refer to:

- Chinese bush warbler (Locustella tacsanowskia), a species of bird
- Chinese leaf warbler (Phylloscopus yunnanensis), a species of bird
- West Chinese leaf warbler (Phylloscopus affinis occisinensis), a subspecies of bird; also known as Alpine leaf warbler
