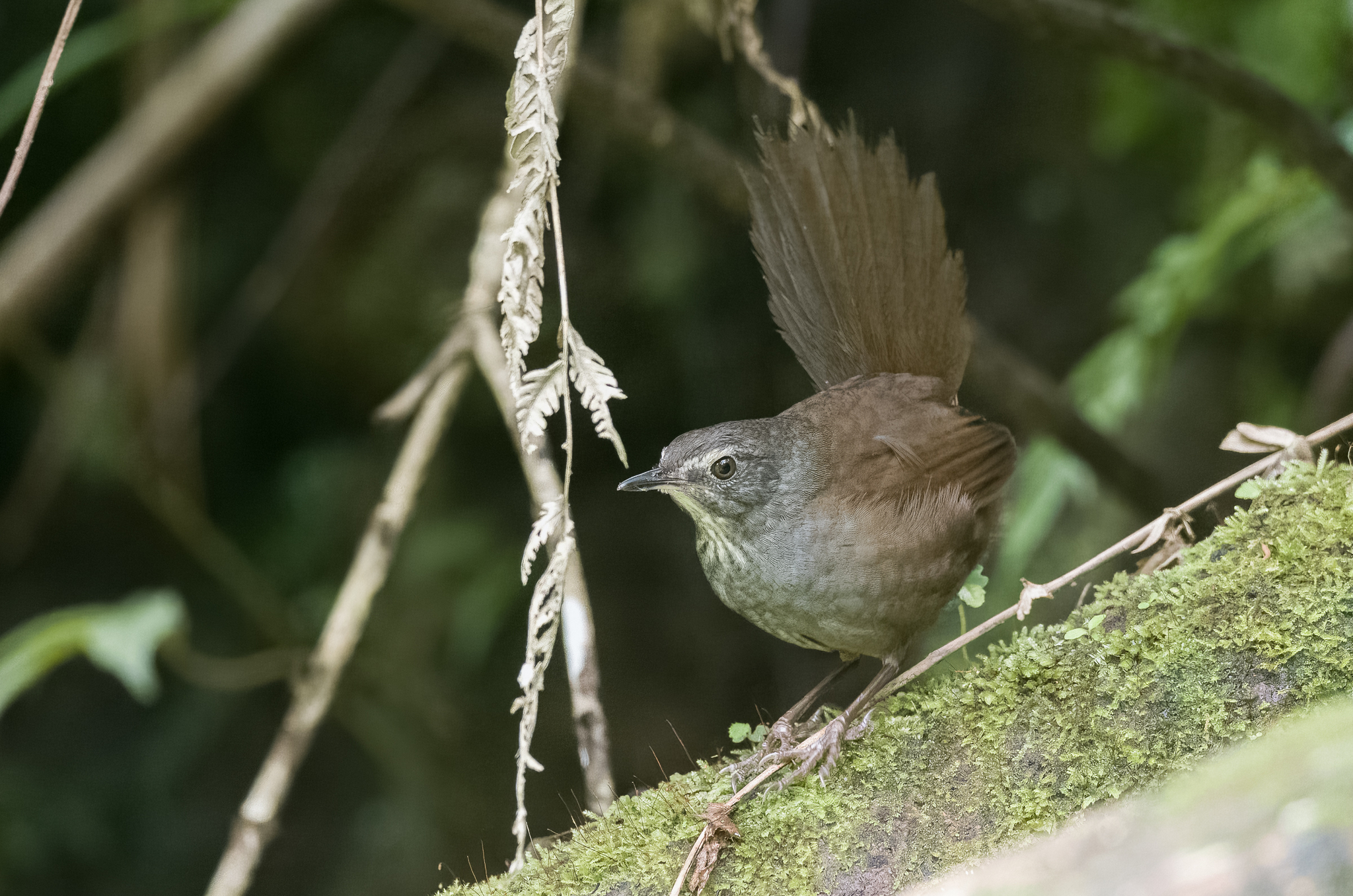

Conservation status
- Least Concern (IUCN 3.1)

Scientific classification
- Kingdom: Animalia
- Phylum: Chordata
- Class: Aves
- Order: Passeriformes
- Family: Locustellidae
- Genus: Locustella
- Species: L. caudata

Binomial name
- Locustella caudata (Ogilvie-Grant, 1895)

Synonyms
- Pseudotharrhaleus caudatus; Bradypterus caudatus; Locustella caudatus

= Long-tailed bush warbler =

Species of bird

The long-tailed bush warbler (Locustella caudata) also known as the Long-tailed grasshopper-warbler is a species of grass warbler (family Locustellidae). It was formerly included in the "Old World warbler" assemblage. It is found only in the Philippines on the islands of Mindanao and Luzon.

== Description and taxonomy ==
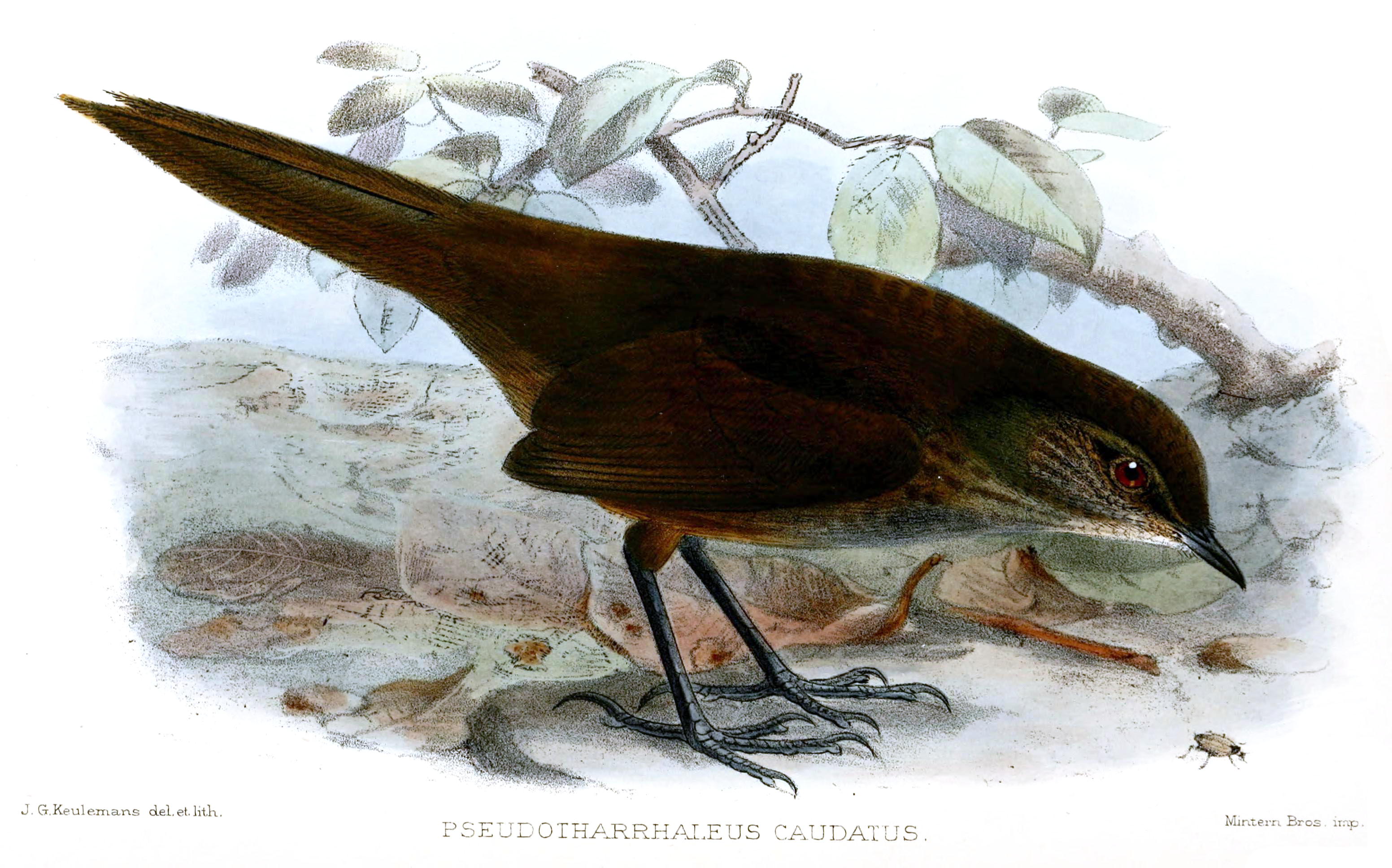
Illustration by J. G. Keulemans (1895)

Three subspecies are recognised:

- L. c. caudata– all of Mindanao except the Zamboanga Peninsula; Longer tail
- L. c. malindangensis – west Mindanao in the Zamboanga Peninsula - Darker sides on face and a whiter throat
- L. c. unicolor – Luzon; Dark upperparts, rufous belly and a shorter tail

The birds in Luzon and Mindanao have vastly different calls and the potential of there is potential for these birds to be split into their own distinctive species.

== Ecology and behavior ==
These birds feed on small insects. Forages alone or singly. Breeding season is unkwnon but young birds seen from February to September.

== Habitat and conservation status ==
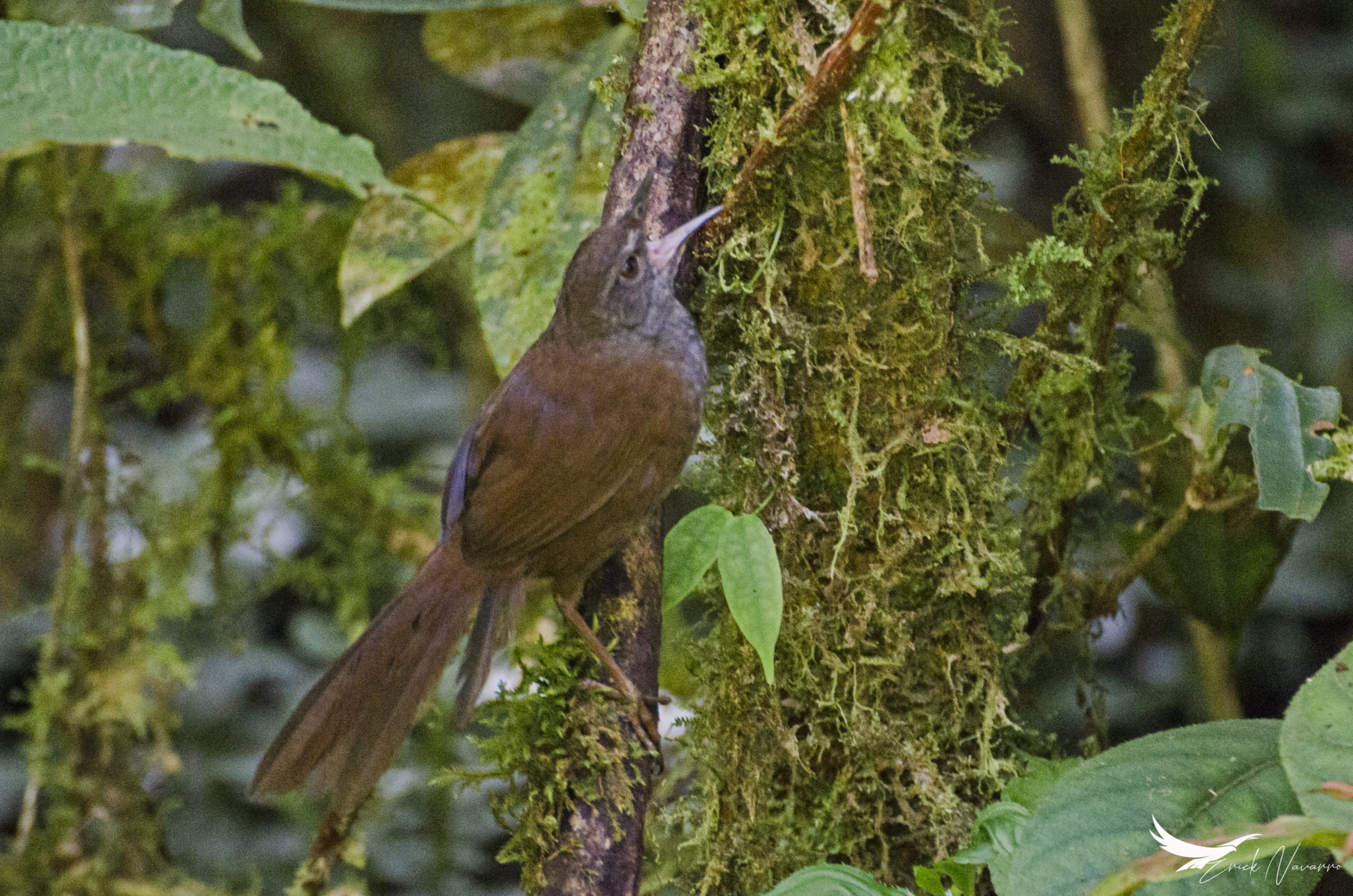
A calling Long-tailed bushwarbler ssp. caudata

It occupies montane mossy forest above 700 meters above sea level.

IUCN has assessed this bird as Least-concern as a lot of its montane habitat is difficult to access and it is reasonably common within its wide range. However, it is still declining due to habitat loss through deforestation, mining, land conversion and slash-and-burn.
