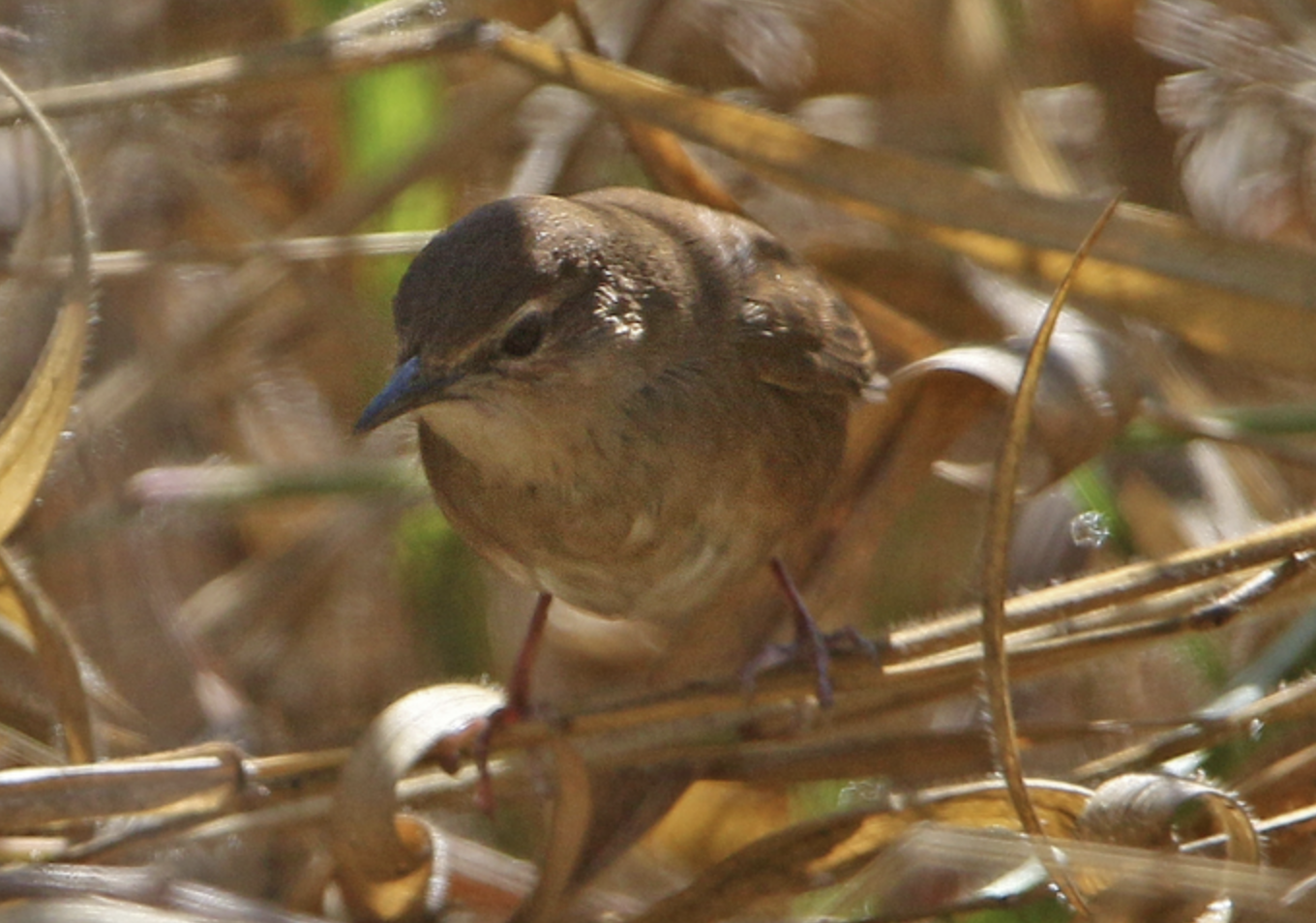
- near Dalat, Vietnam

Scientific classification
- Kingdom: Animalia
- Phylum: Chordata
- Class: Aves
- Order: Passeriformes
- Family: Locustellidae
- Genus: Locustella
- Species: L. idonea

Binomial name
- Locustella idonea (Riley, 1940)

Synonyms
- Bradypterus idonea Locustella mandelli idonea

= Dalat bush warbler =

Species of bird

The Dalat bush warbler (Locustella idonea) is a songbird species. Formerly placed in the "Old World warbler" assemblage, it is now placed in the newly recognized family Locustellidae. It was until recently considered a subspecies of Locustella mandelli and the name "russet bush warbler" was applied to the entire species complex. After this was split up, "Dalat bush warbler" was proposed. Some authorities still consider this species conspecific with the russet bush warbler. The species is found in south-central Vietnam.
