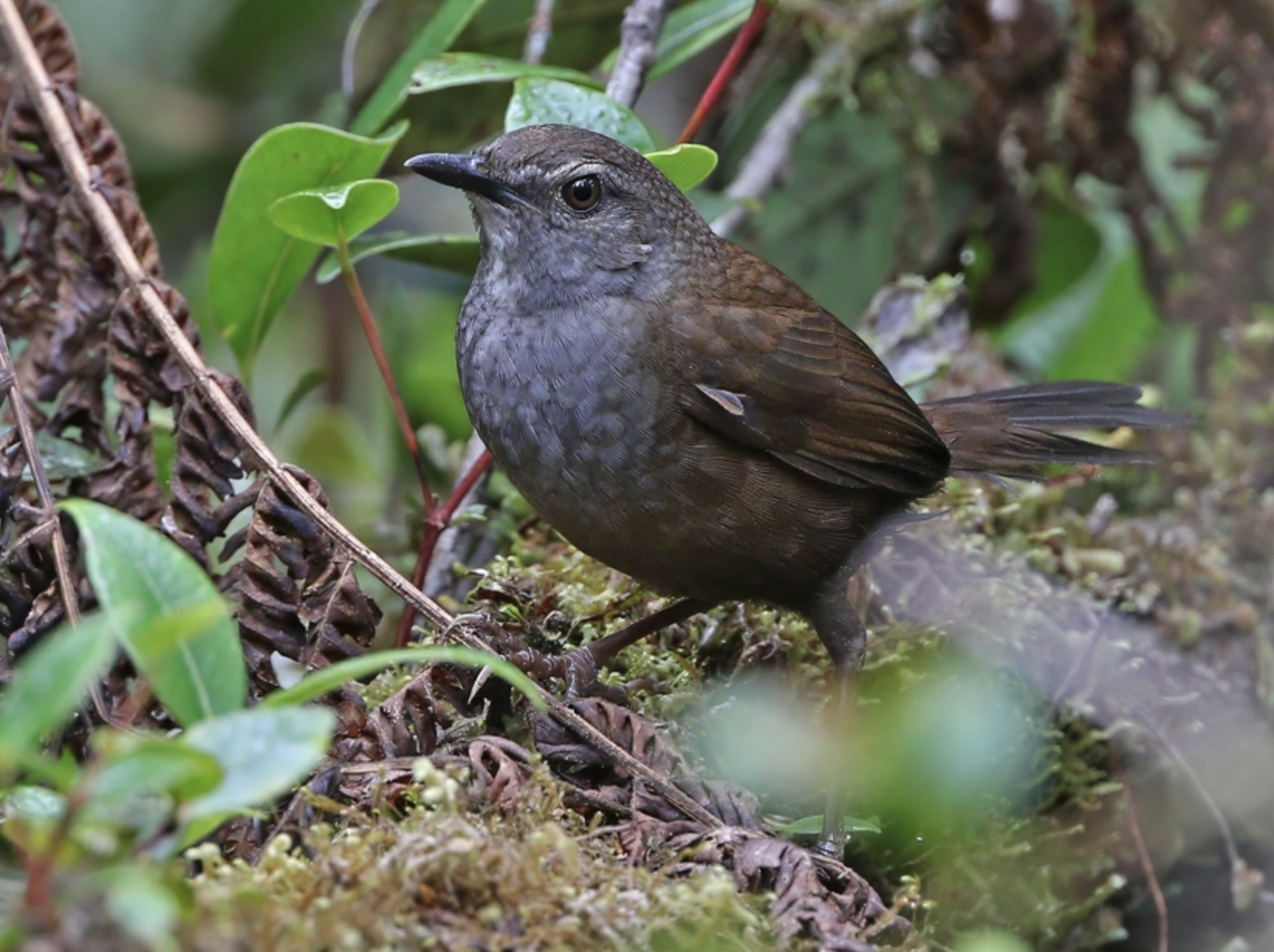

Scientific classification
- Domain: Eukaryota
- Kingdom: Animalia
- Phylum: Chordata
- Class: Aves
- Order: Passeriformes
- Family: Locustellidae
- Genus: Locustella
- Species: L. portenta

Binomial name
- Locustella portenta Rheindt et al., 2020

= Taliabu bush warbler =

Species of bird

The Taliabu bush warbler (Locustella portenta) is a species of Old World warbler in the family Locustellidae. It is endemic to the island regency of Taliabu in Indonesia.

It has a very small, restricted distribution in a few square kilometers of a mountainous region of the island. It can be distinguished from other members of the genus Locustella by its unique vocalizations, as well as the fine dusty speckling on its body which increases towards the breast and lower throat. It was described in 2020 alongside 9 other new species and subspecies of birds endemic to islands in Wallacea. All of them were discovered in surveys during 2009 and 2013, the largest such discovery in over a century. Unlike many other bird species described in the study, its existence was not known to the locals on its native island as its calls sounded more like an insect than a bird. Due to its very restricted distribution, it is potentially at major risk from wildfires and logging.

== See also ==
- List of bird species described in the 2020s
