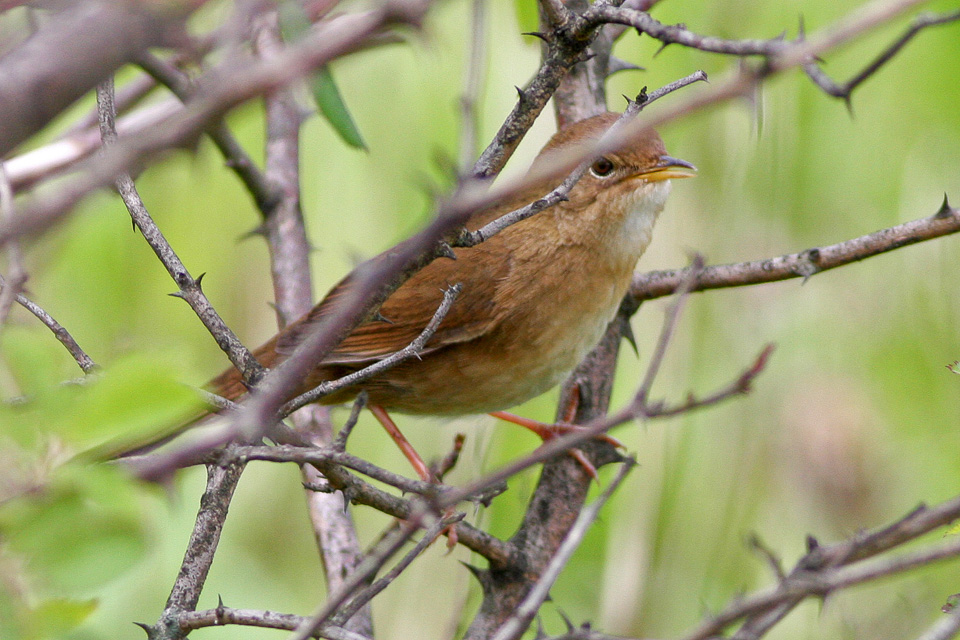
- In Wuyi National Park, Huangang Shan, Jiangxi, China

Conservation status
- Least Concern (IUCN 3.1)

Scientific classification
- Kingdom: Animalia
- Phylum: Chordata
- Class: Aves
- Order: Passeriformes
- Family: Locustellidae
- Genus: Locustella
- Species: L. luteoventris

Binomial name
- Locustella luteoventris (Hodgson, 1845)

Synonyms
- Bradypterus luteoventris

= Brown bush warbler =

Species of bird

The brown bush warbler (Locustella luteoventris) is a songbird species. Formerly placed in the "Old World warbler" assemblage as Bradypterus luteoventrus, it is now placed in the newly recognized family Locustellidae.

It is found in Bangladesh, Bhutan, China, Hong Kong, India, Myanmar, Nepal, Thailand, and Vietnam. Its natural habitat is boreal forests during breeding and subtropical and tropical forest in the winter quarters.
