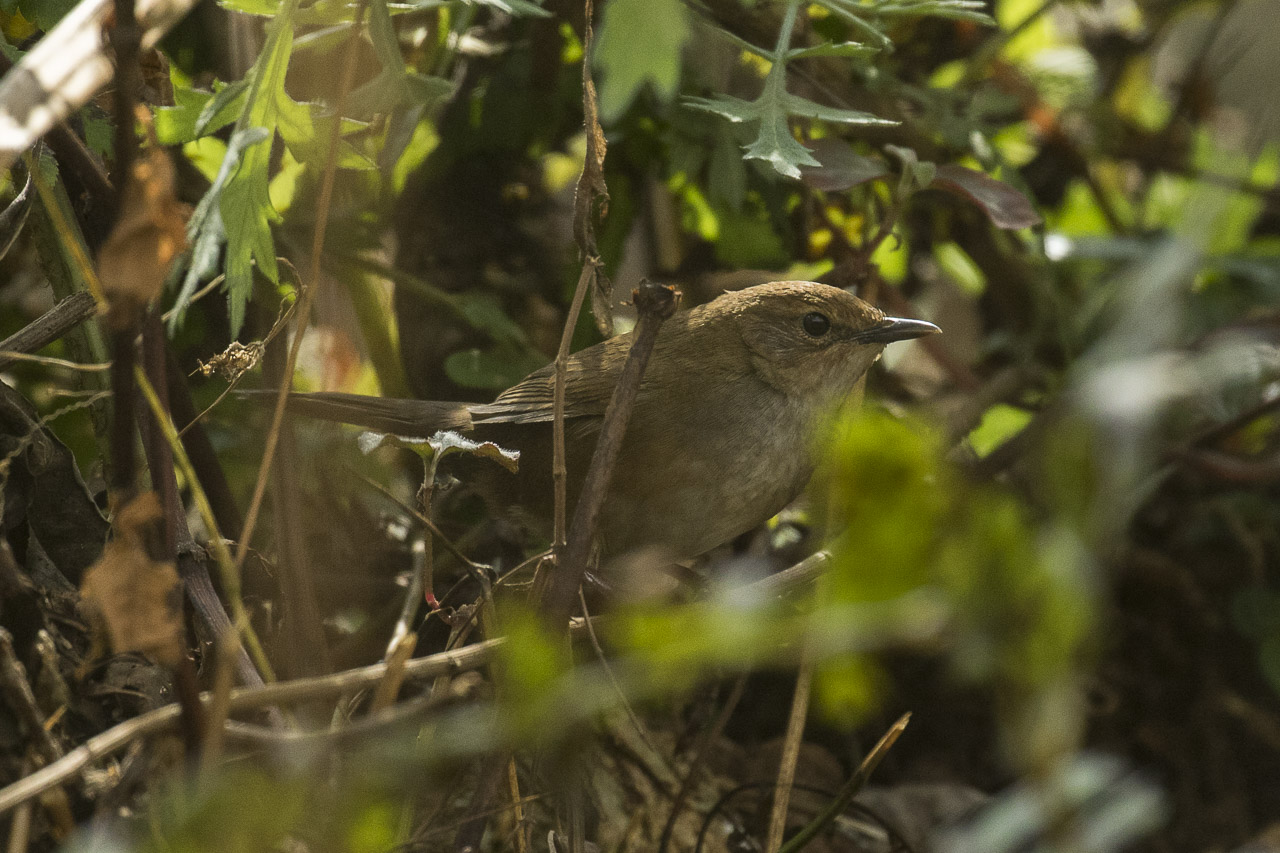
- In Arunachal Pradesh, India

Conservation status
- Least Concern (IUCN 3.1)

Scientific classification
- Kingdom: Animalia
- Phylum: Chordata
- Class: Aves
- Order: Passeriformes
- Family: Locustellidae
- Genus: Locustella
- Species: L. mandelli

Binomial name
- Locustella mandelli (W.E. Brooks, 1875)

Synonyms
- Bradypterus mandelli

= Russet bush warbler =

Species of bird

The russet bush warbler (Locustella mandelli) is a songbird species. Formerly placed in the "Old World warbler" assemblage, it is now placed in the newly recognized family Locustellidae. B. mandelli was until recently considered a subspecies of B. seebohmi, and the name "russet bush warbler" was applied to the entire species complex. After this was split up, Benguet bush warbler was proposed as a new name for B. seebohmi proper. The species is found in southeast Asia.

The scientific name commemorates the Italian naturalist Louis Mandelli.
