= Benguet bush warbler =

Conservation status
- Least Concern (IUCN 3.1)

Scientific classification
- Kingdom: Animalia
- Phylum: Chordata
- Class: Aves
- Order: Passeriformes
- Family: Locustellidae
- Genus: Locustella
- Species: L. seebohmi

Binomial name
- Locustella seebohmi (Ogilvie-Grant, 1895)

Synonyms
- Bradypterus seebohmi

Species of bird

The Benguet bush warbler (Locustella seebohmi), also known as the Benguet grasshopper-warbler, is a songbird species. Formerly placed in the "Old World warbler" assemblage, it is now placed in the newly recognized family Locustellidae. It is found in the mountains of northern Luzon in the Philippines.

== Description and taxonomy ==
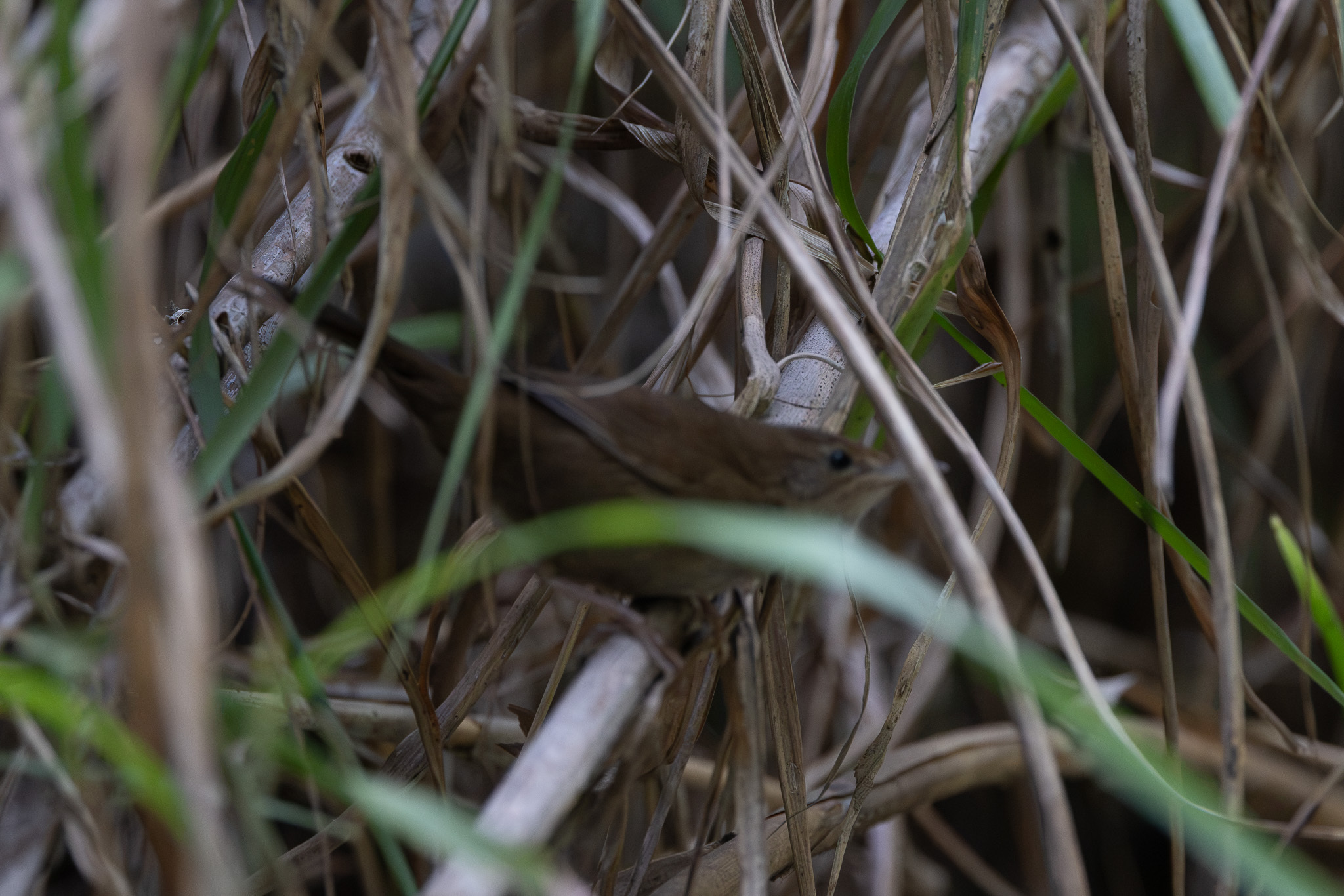

It is a small and slender bird found in montane grassy valleys. This species is predominantly warm brown with a white throat and a grayish chest. It has a pale brow and pale barring on the vent.

Its call is described as a series of cricket like ringing notes at regular intervals.

Previously placed in Bradypterus but is now in Locustella. It was formerly conspecific with the Russet bush warbler.This species is monotypic and has no subspecies.

== Ecology and behavior ==
Nothing is known about its ecology. It is presumed to feed on insects. It is most vocal in February.

== Habitat and conservation status ==
It is found to steep grass valleys in montane areas from 800 to 1,800 metres (2,620 to 5,910 ft) above sea level. It appears to be limited to drier areas, and has been found in areas both with or without pine trees. Little else is known about this bird.

IUCN has assessed this bird as least-concern with the population believed to be stable.

There is a need for surveys to determine whether this species is rare and possibly threatened or whether it is just widely overlooked. Studies of its habitat associations and tolerance of degraded areas are needed.
