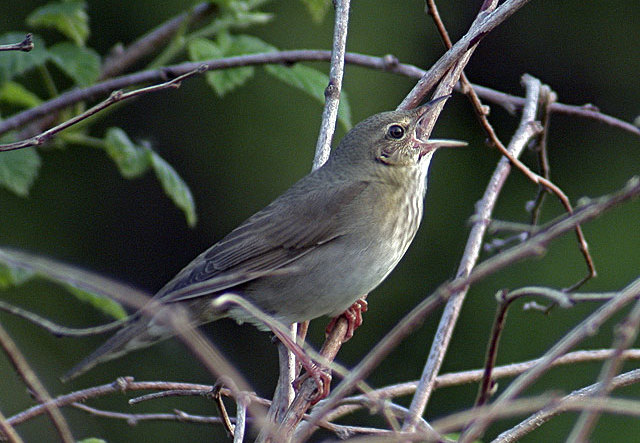
- In Horred, Västra Götaland, Sweden

Conservation status
- Least Concern (IUCN 3.1)

Scientific classification
- Kingdom: Animalia
- Phylum: Chordata
- Class: Aves
- Order: Passeriformes
- Family: Locustellidae
- Genus: Locustella
- Species: L. fluviatilis

Binomial name
- Locustella fluviatilis (Wolf, 1810)
- Range of L. fluviatilis Breeding Passage Non-breeding Possibly Extant (passage)

Audio
- Song recorded in the Netherlands

= River warbler =

Species of bird

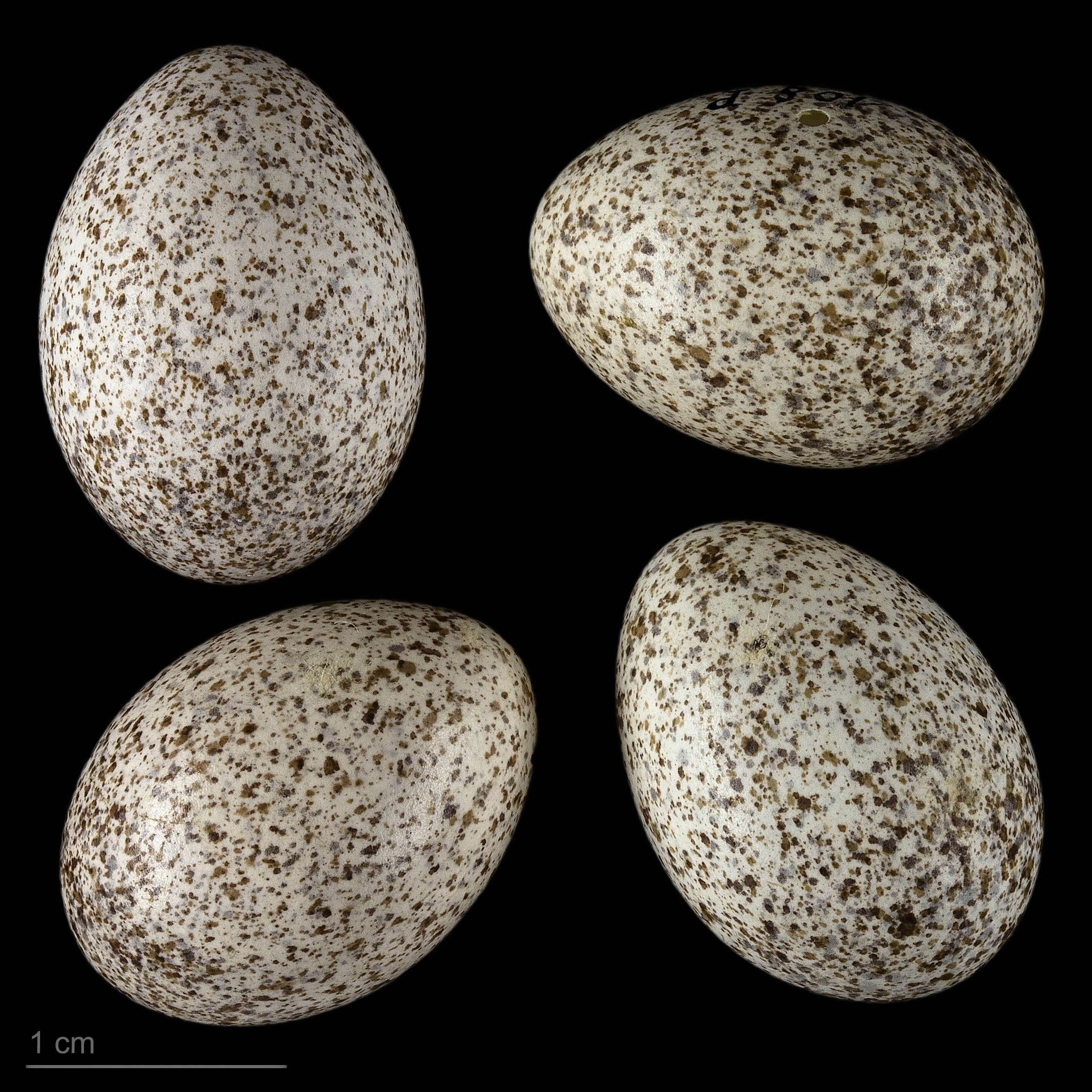
Locustella fluviatilis - MHNT

The river warbler (Locustella fluviatilis) is an Old World warbler in the genus Locustella. It breeds in eastern and central Europe and is migratory, wintering in inland southern Africa, from around the Zambezi River south to the vicinity of Pretoria in South Africa.

== Taxonomy and etymology ==
The genus name Locustella is from Latin and is a diminutive of locusta, "grasshopper". This refers to the song of the common grasshopper warbler and some others in this genus. The specific fluviatilis is Latin for "of a river".

It is a monotypic species, meaning it has no subspecies.

== Description ==
This is a largish warbler. The adult has an unstreaked grey-brown back, whitish grey underparts, and a darker undertail, which has white feather tips giving a contrasting pattern. The sexes are identical, as with most warblers, but young birds are yellower below. Some birds can show reduced dark markings on the undertail coverts (caused by more extensive than usual white tips) and thus are closer in appearance to Savi's warbler than typical river warblers. However, they typically still have a streaked breast and more olive colouration on the upperparts.

This is a skulking species which is very difficult to see except sometimes when singing. It creeps through grass and low foliage.

The song is a monotonous mechanical insect-like reeling, often given at dusk. It is similar to the song of other species in the group, but has more of a sewing machine quality, and may be produced for long periods.

== Ecology ==
This small passerine bird is a species found in dense deciduous vegetation close to water in bogs or near a river. Five to seven eggs are laid in a nest in a tussock or on the ground. This species is a rare vagrant to western Europe. In Britain, a small number of males have set up territories in spring, including a bird in Greater Manchester in 1995. One exceptional vagrant was photographed in Gambell, Alaska, in October 2017.

Like most warblers, it is insectivorous.

== Status ==
The river warbler has an extensive range and a large population size. Although its population trend appears to be declining, the rate of decline is not considered rapid enough to meet the thresholds for Vulnerability. As a result, the species is classified as "Least Concern" on the IUCN Red List.
