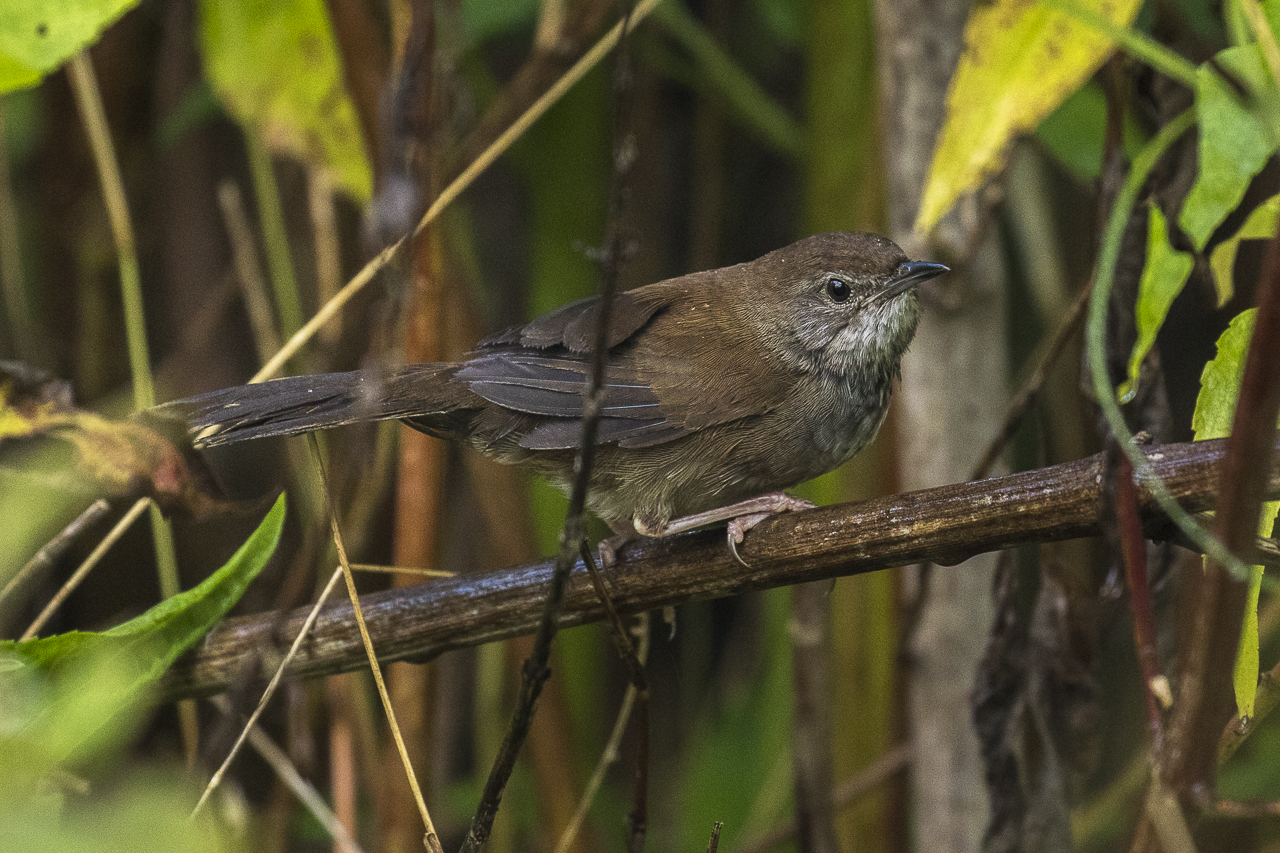

Conservation status
- Least Concern (IUCN 3.1)

Scientific classification
- Kingdom: Animalia
- Phylum: Chordata
- Class: Aves
- Order: Passeriformes
- Family: Locustellidae
- Genus: Locustella
- Species: L. montis

Binomial name
- Locustella montis (Hartert, 1896)

Synonyms
- Bradypterus montis

= Javan bush warbler =

Species of bird

The Javan bush warbler (Locustella montis) is a songbird species. Formerly placed in the "Old World warbler" assemblage, it is now placed in the newly recognized family Locustellidae.

It is found in the mountains of eastern Java, Bali, Timor and Alor Island.

It is an insectivore.
