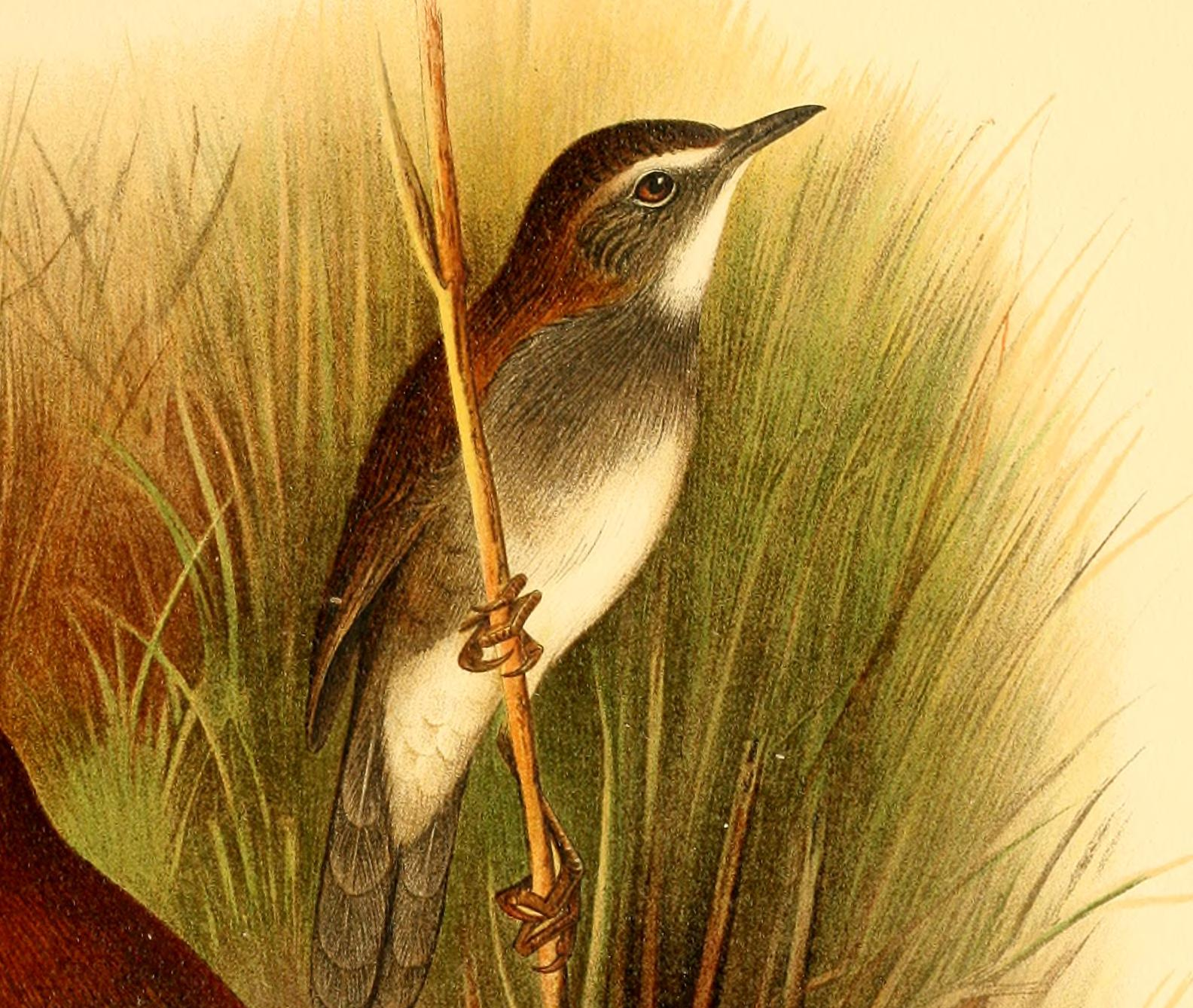

Conservation status
- Least Concern (IUCN 3.1)

Scientific classification
- Kingdom: Animalia
- Phylum: Chordata
- Class: Aves
- Order: Passeriformes
- Family: Locustellidae
- Genus: Locustella
- Species: L. alfredi

Binomial name
- Locustella alfredi (Hartlaub, 1890)

Synonyms
- Bradypterus alfredi

= Bamboo warbler =

Species of bird

The bamboo warbler (Locustella alfredi) or bamboo scrub-warbler, is a species of Old World warbler in the family Locustellidae.

It is sparsely distributed across central-eastern Africa.

Its natural habitats are subtropical or tropical moist montane forests and subtropical or tropical moist shrubland.
