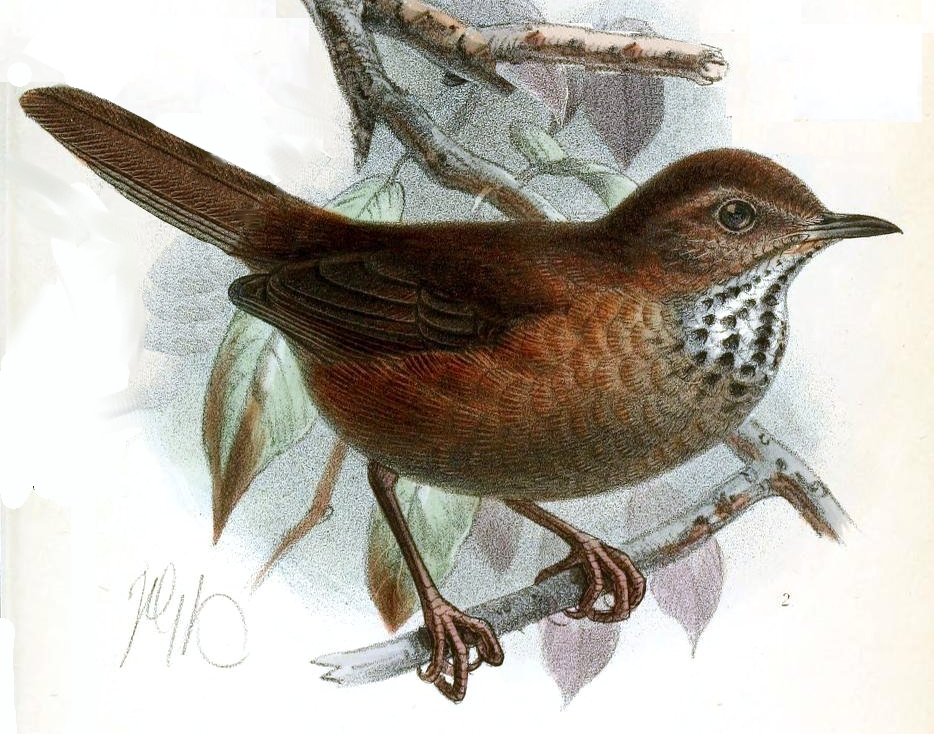
- Illustration by J. G. Keulemans (1888)
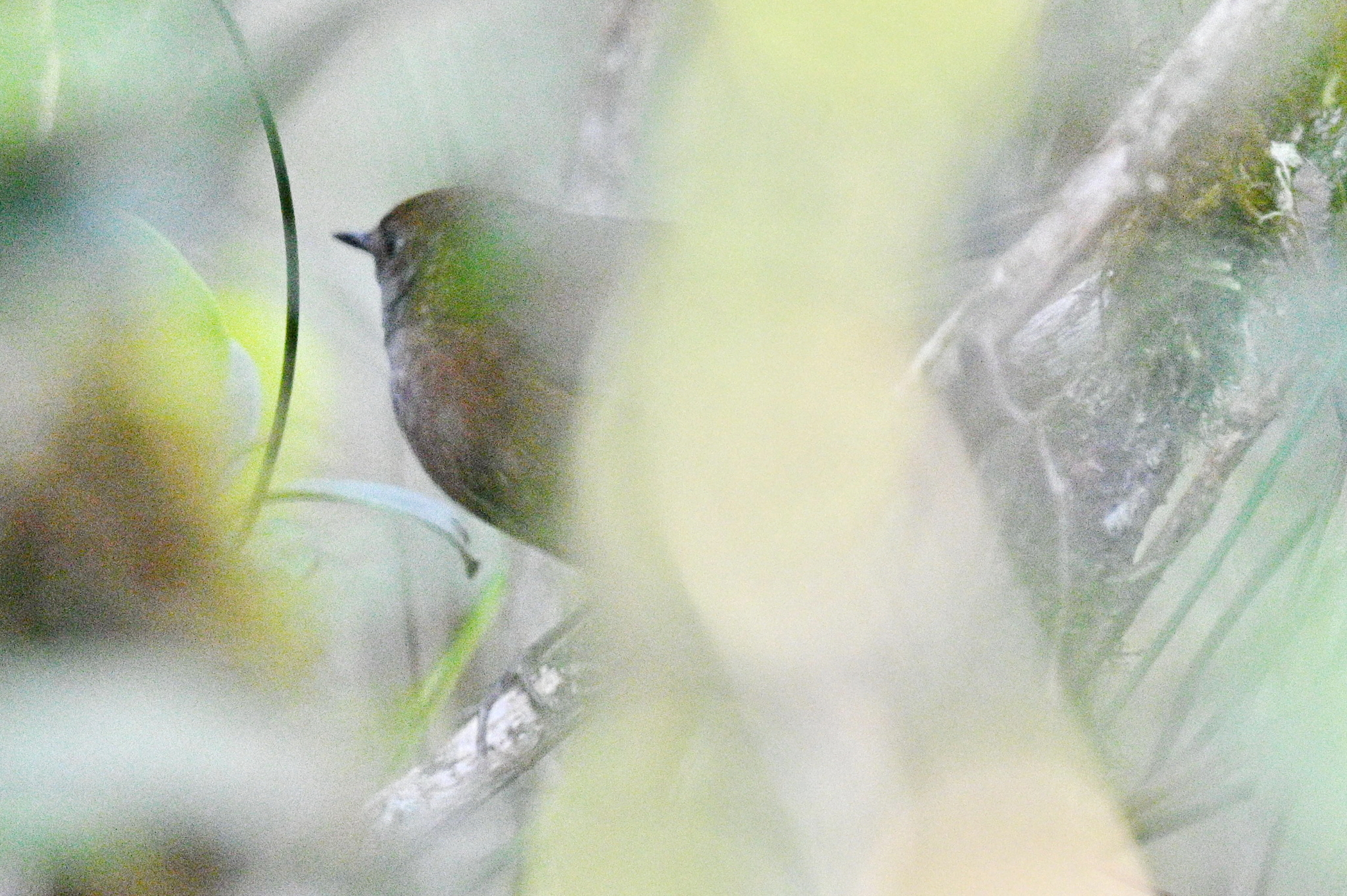

Conservation status
- Least Concern (IUCN 3.1)

Scientific classification
- Kingdom: Animalia
- Phylum: Chordata
- Class: Aves
- Order: Passeriformes
- Family: Locustellidae
- Genus: Locustella
- Species: L. accentor

Binomial name
- Locustella accentor (Sharpe, 1888)

Synonyms
- Bradypterus accentor

= Friendly bush warbler =

Species of bird

The friendly bush warbler (Locustella accentor), also known as the Kinabalu friendly warbler, is a species of Old World warbler in the family Locustellidae. It is endemic to the island of Borneo.
