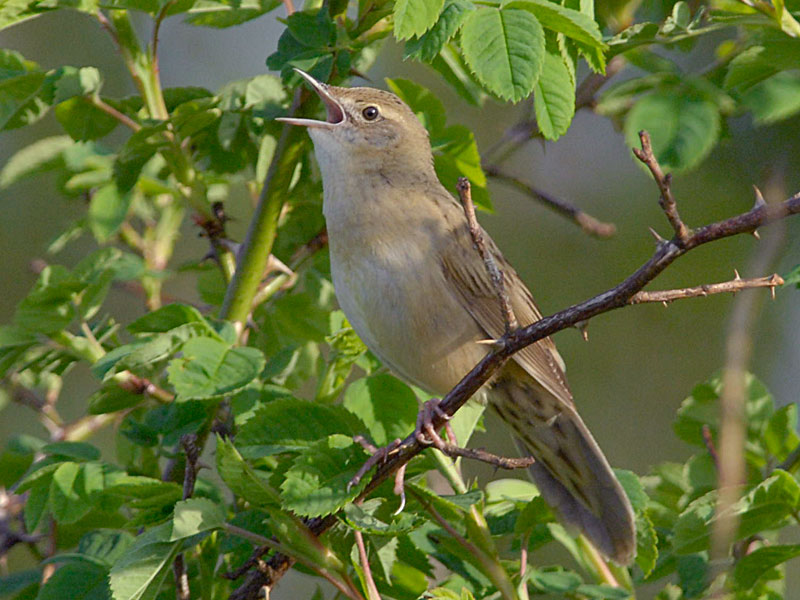

Conservation status
- Least Concern (IUCN 3.1)

Scientific classification
- Kingdom: Animalia
- Phylum: Chordata
- Class: Aves
- Order: Passeriformes
- Family: Locustellidae
- Genus: Locustella
- Species: L. naevia

Binomial name
- Locustella naevia (Boddaert, 1783)
- Range of L. naevia Breeding Passage Non-breeding

Audio
- Song of male grasshopper warbler, recorded in the UK

= Common grasshopper warbler =

Species of bird

The common grasshopper warbler or just grasshopper warbler (Locustella naevia) is a species of Old World warbler in the genus Locustella. It breeds across much of temperate Europe and the western Palearctic. It is migratory, wintering across northern tropical Africa just south of the Sahara, and also locally in India.

This small passerine bird is found in dense grassland vegetation, often close to water, and usually with a few small scattered shrubs. It is a medium-sized warbler about 13 cm (5 in) long. The adult has a streaked brown back and whitish grey underparts which are unstreaked except on the undertail coverts. The sexes are identical, as with most warblers, but young birds are yellower below. Like most warblers, it is insectivorous. Four to seven eggs are laid in a nest on or near the ground in thick vegetation or in a tussock of grass.

This is a species which skulks in the undergrowth, creeping through bushes and low foliage, and which is very difficult to see except when singing from a prominent position. The song, which gives this species its name, is a mechanical grasshopper-like reeling, often given at dawn or dusk.

== Taxonomy ==
The Italian naturalist Ulisse Aldrovandi included the common grasshopper warbler in the second volume of his Ornithologiae. Aldrovandi died in 1605 but the volume was not published until 1637. In 1760 the French zoologist Mathurin Jacques Brisson included a detailed description of the common grasshopper warbler in his Ornithologie. He used the French name La fauvette tachetée and the Latin name Curruca naevia but although Brisson coined Latin names, these do not conform to the binomial system and are not recognised by the International Commission on Zoological Nomenclature.

Its first formal scientific description was by the French polymath Georges-Louis Leclerc, Comte de Buffon in 1779 in his Histoire Naturelle des Oiseaux. The bird was also illustrated in a hand-coloured plate engraved by François-Nicolas Martinet in the Planches Enluminées D'Histoire Naturelle which was produced under the supervision of Edme-Louis Daubenton to accompany Buffon's text. Neither the plate caption nor Buffon's description included a scientific name but in 1783 the Dutch naturalist Pieter Boddaert coined the binomial name Motacilla naevia in his catalogue of the Planches Enluminées; he used the word naevia that had earlier been used by Brisson. The type locality is Bologna in Italy. The common grasshopper warbler is now one of 20 species placed in the genus Locustella that was described by the German naturalist Johann Jakob Kaup in 1829 with the common grasshopper warbler as the type species. The genus name Locustella is from Latin and is a diminutive of locusta, "grasshopper". The specific naevia is Latin for "spotted".

Three subspecies are recognised.

- L. n. naevia (Boddaert, 1783) – Europe to west European Russia and Ukraine; wintering in the Sahel region of Africa
- L. n. straminea Seebohm, 1881 – east European Russia to southwest, south central Siberia, east Kazakhstan, west Mongolia and northwest China; wintering in south Asia; synonym L. n. mongolica
- L. n. obscurior Buturlin, 1929 – east Turkey and the Caucasus

== Description ==
Singing bird, Northumberland, England

The adult is about 12.5 cm (5 in) long, and weighs 11.5–16 grams (0.41–0.56 oz). It is a secretive bird and can be hard to see, but its presence is easily detected because of its characteristic song. The upper-parts are pale olive-brown, each feather having a central darker brown streak. The cheeks are greyish, the irises are brown and there is a faint eye streak behind the eye. The upper mandible of the beak is dark brown and the lower mandible yellowish-brown. The underparts are cream-coloured or yellowish-buff with a few dark brown spots and streaks on the breast and flanks. The wings are brown with the outer edge of the feathers rimmed with paler brown. The tail feathers are reddish-brown with faint transverse bars being visible in some individuals and the under-tail coverts are streaked. The slender legs and the feet are pale yellowish-brown.

The song is a long, high-pitched reeling trill performed with beak held wide open and the whole body vibrating. It lasts from a few seconds to several minutes without any pauses, and is of remarkable speed and complexity, consisting of 52 notes (26 double notes) per second; its speed and high pitch however make it impossible for human ears to analyse without slowed-down recordings. It varies in volume from a sound resembling an angler's reel to a distant mowing machine. It is strongly ventriloqual, making it difficult to pinpoint the location of the singing bird, but has strong carrying power, audible at ranges of up to 500 m to even 1 km. The song can be heard at any time of day or night, but peaks around dawn and dusk, and can be heard from the arrival of the birds in April until early August. The alarm call is a repeated ticking noise that has been rendered as "twkit-twkit-twkit". The song shows similar 'reeling' structure to that of some of its congeners, notably lanceolated warbler (Locustella lanceolata), Savi's warbler (Locustella luscinioides) and river warbler (Locustella fluviatilis), though they are all distinguishable in different tones and speed.

== Distribution and habitat ==
The common grasshopper warbler breeds in northwest Europe and the western Palearctic. The range includes Spain, France, central Italy, Romania, Yugoslavia, the British Isles, Belgium, Netherlands, Germany, Denmark, southern Sweden, southern Finland, the Baltic States and western parts of Russia. Further east it is replaced by related species. In autumn, it migrates south to the Sahel region of tropical Africa, India and Sri Lanka where it overwinters.

In the breeding season, the grasshopper warbler is found in damp or dry places with rough grass and bushes such as the edges of fens, clearings, neglected hedgerows, heaths, upland moors, gorse-covered areas, young plantations and felled woodland. In the winter, it is usually found in similar locations but information is scarce on its distribution and habitat due to its unobtrusive and skulking behaviour.

== Behaviour ==
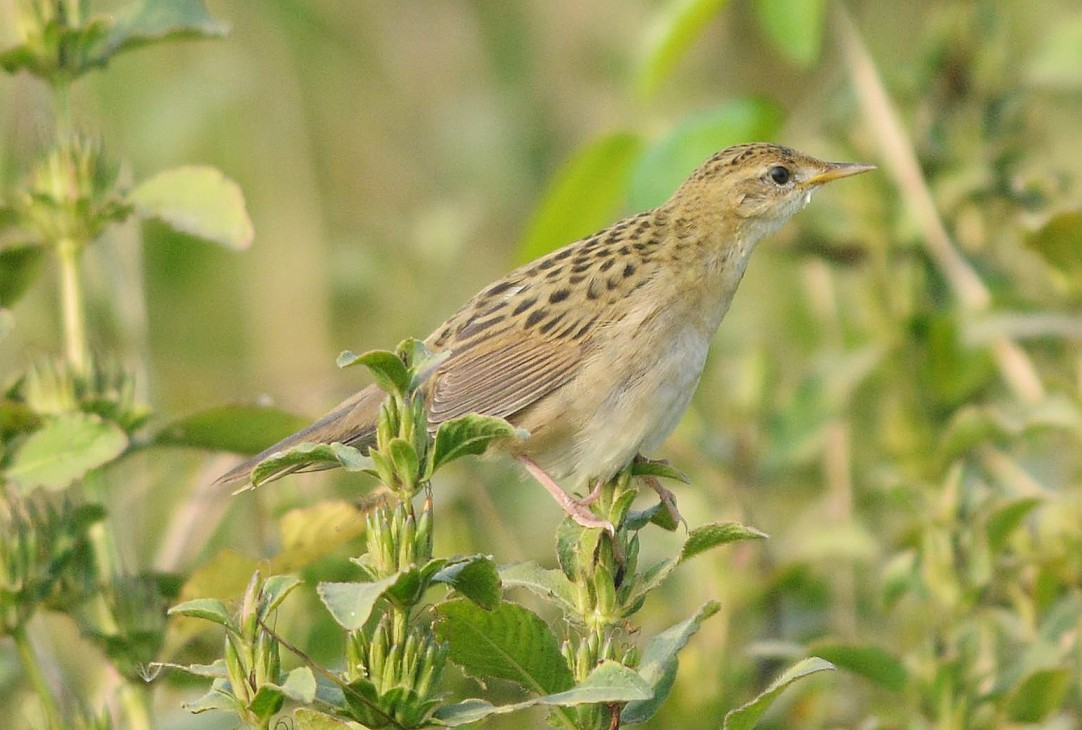
Grasshopper warbler (Locustella naevia)

Apart from their migration, grasshopper warblers rarely fly much, but spend their time scurrying through dense vegetation, flitting from twig to twig or running along the ground. It has a peculiar high-stepping gait and long stride as it moves along horizontal stems, looking slender and tapering. It seldom flies, soon diving back into cover, and when it alights it often raises and flares its tail to show its streaked under-tail coverts. It has been known to feign injury in order to distract a potential predator.

=== Breeding ===
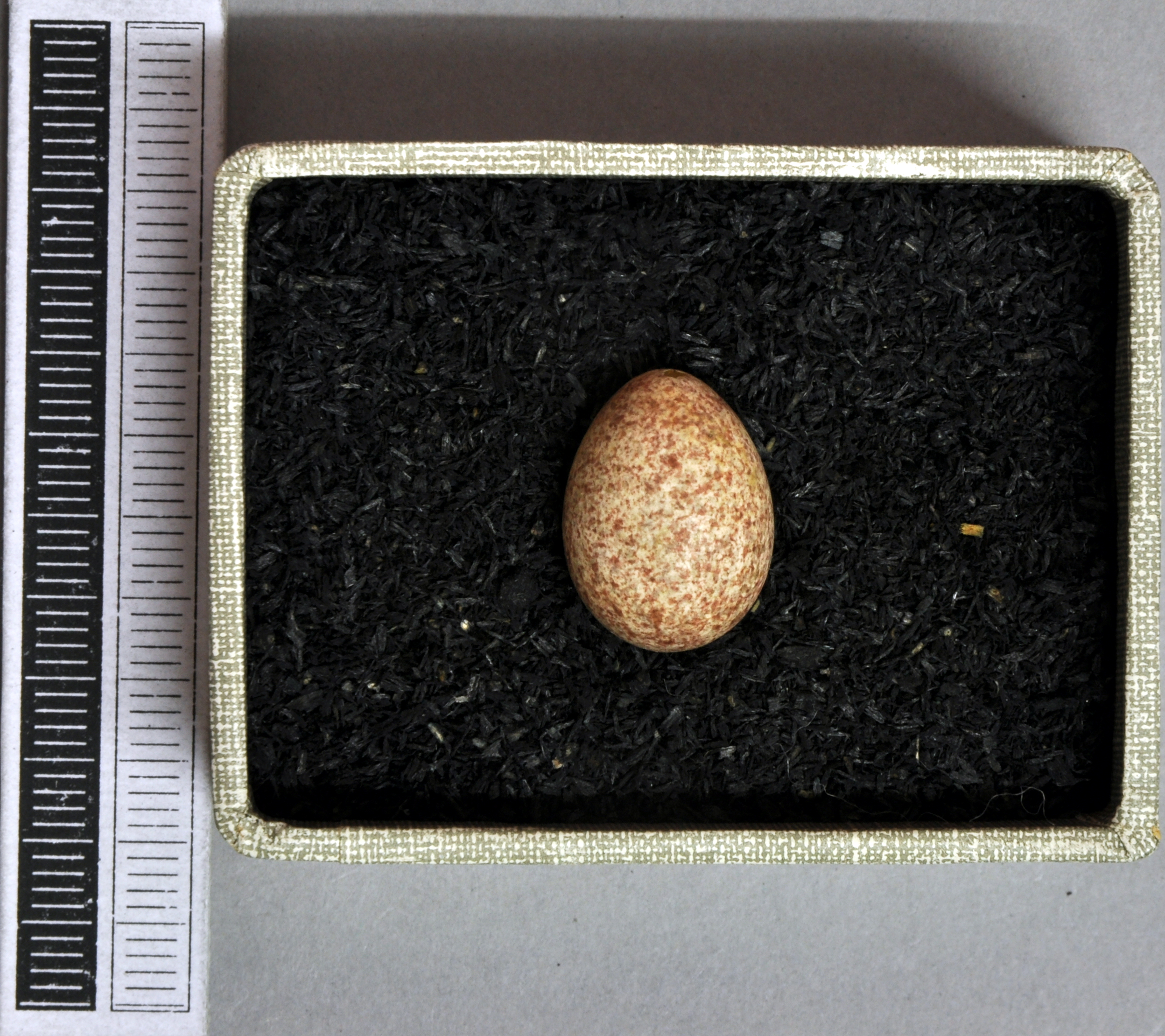
Egg, Collection Museum Wiesbaden, Germany

Male common grasshopper warblers try to attract females by displaying to them. They walk or run along twigs with tail spread, fluttering their wings as they raise and lower them, often carrying a grass or leaf in their beak. In the air, with wings well extended and fluttering, they spread their tail and fluff their feathers.

Both sexes take part in nest-building. The nest is well-concealed and built close to the ground in such places as grass tussocks, gorse bushes, osier beds, reed beds, tangled hedgerows, scrub and among coarse heather plants on moorland. It varies in size and shape but is constructed of grasses, sedges and mosses and often lined with fine grasses. A clutch of four to six eggs is laid. These are creamy white speckled with fine reddish spots, usually randomly distributed but sometimes merged into blotches or zones. The eggs measure 18 by 14 mm (0.71 by 0.55 in) and weigh about 1.7 g (0.06 oz). Both parents are involved in incubating the eggs which takes about fourteen days. The chicks are altricial and are fed on insects. They fledge in twelve to thirteen days and there are usually two broods in the season. Young birds become mature at a year old and the highest recorded age for this species is five years.

=== Food and feeding ===
The common grasshopper warbler is insectivorous, feeding on a wide range of invertebrates. Its diet includes flies, moths, beetles, aphids, dragonflies and mayflies and their larvae. Spiders and woodlice are also eaten and the chicks are fed on aphids, green caterpillars, woodlice and flies.

== Status ==
The common grasshopper warbler is assessed by the IUCN in their Red List of Threatened Species as being of Least Concern. This is because it has a large total population and an extensive range. The population in Europe is estimated to be between 840,000 and 2.2 million breeding pairs with a total of 2.5 to 6.6 million individuals. As Europe amounts to about two thirds of its total range, the world population is estimated to be in the region of 3.4 to 13.2 million individuals. The total number of birds may be on the decline because of habitat loss, but not to an extent that would warrant listing the bird under a higher risk category. In a study examining the possible effects of global warming on the range of various species of bird, it was estimated that the breeding range of the common grasshopper warbler would be displaced several hundred miles northwards and would cover the British Isles and the whole of Scandinavia but that it would cease to breed in much of its present range in mainland Europe.
