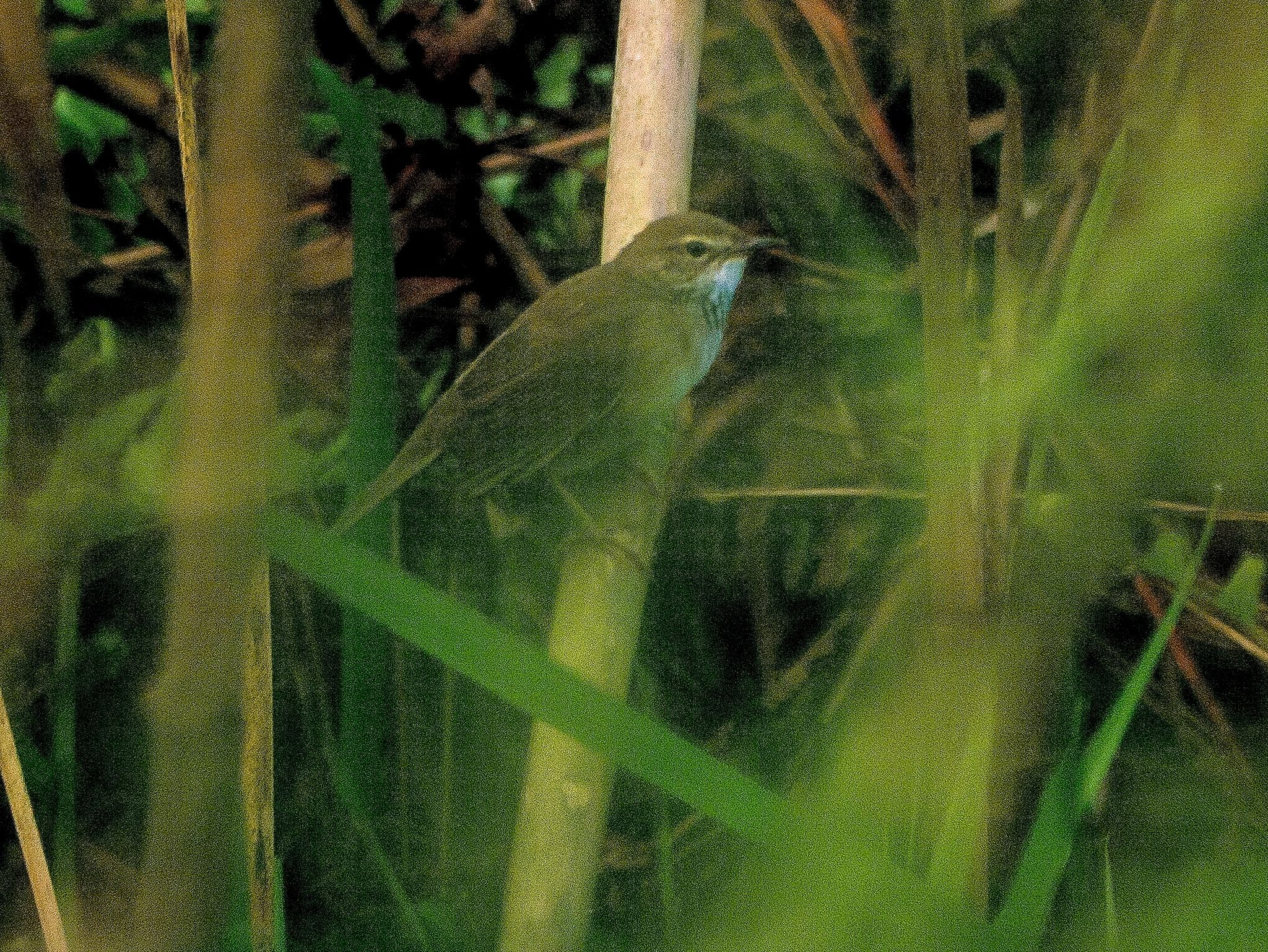

Conservation status
- Least Concern (IUCN 3.1)

Scientific classification
- Kingdom: Animalia
- Phylum: Chordata
- Class: Aves
- Order: Passeriformes
- Family: Locustellidae
- Genus: Locustella
- Species: L. davidi

Binomial name
- Locustella davidi (La Touche, 1923)

Synonyms
- Bradypterus davidi

= Baikal bush warbler =

Species of bird

The Baikal bush warbler (Locustella davidi), also known as Baikal grasshopper-warbler or David's bush warbler, is a migratory species of Old World warbler in the family Locustellidae.

It breeds from the southern part of the Russian Far East (including the Lake Baikal region) to northeast China (southern Heilongjiang south to southern Hebei) and North Korea. It winters from southern China south to northern Thailand.

Its breeding habitat is taiga forests, especially in clearings or at streams.
