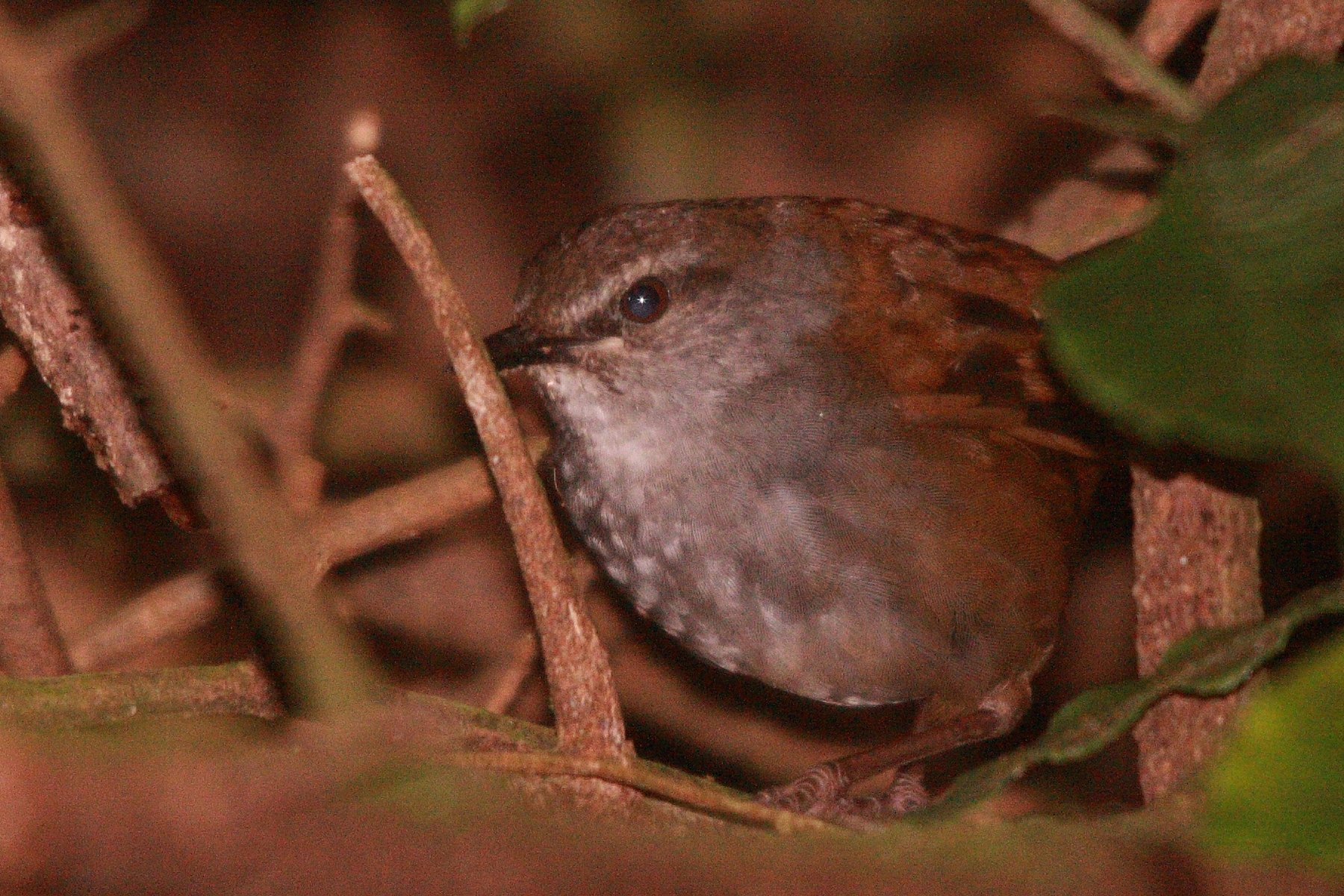
- At Mt Masarang, North Sulawesi

Conservation status
- Least Concern (IUCN 3.1)

Scientific classification
- Kingdom: Animalia
- Phylum: Chordata
- Class: Aves
- Order: Passeriformes
- Family: Locustellidae
- Genus: Locustella
- Species: L. castanea

Binomial name
- Locustella castanea (Büttikofer, 1893)

Synonyms
- Bradypterus castaneus

= Sulawesi bush warbler =

Species of bird

The Sulawesi bush warbler (Locustella castanea) is a species of Old World warbler in the family Locustellidae. It is endemic to the island of Sulawesi in Indonesia where it is found on the forest floor.

== Taxonomy ==
There are two subspecies:

- L. c. castanea (Büttikofer, 1893) - most of montane Sulawesi aside from the southwest
- L. c. everetti (Hartert, 1896) - southwestern montane Sulawesi

== Habitat ==
The Sulawesi bush warbler is found in undisturbed primary montane forest and in secondary forest, as well as adjoining thick scrub, bushes and rank grassland. It has a preference for moss-covered rocks and tree trunks densely clad with vines. On Seram it frequents lower mountain slopes in Lithospermum and Castanopsis woodland with Shorea, Agathis and Dacrydium trees, ferns and mosses, and also dense patches of bamboo. One of the places where this bird can be found on Sulawesi is the Gunung Ambang Nature Reserve.

== Behaviour ==
The Sulawesi bush warbler is a mostly ground-dwelling bird, skulking in the undergrowth and running on the forest floor in a manner reminiscent of a mouse. It often flicks its wings over its back and cocks its tail slightly. It sometimes sings perched on a low branch. The song is a repetitive series of short, insect-like buzzing trills, "tzeeeuuutzeee". The breeding habits of this species are unknown but a fully-fledged juvenile has been seen in August.

== Status ==
The population trend of the Sulawesi bush warbler appears to be steady and although it has a limited distribution, it is common in parts of its range and the IUCN has evaluated it as being of "least concern".
