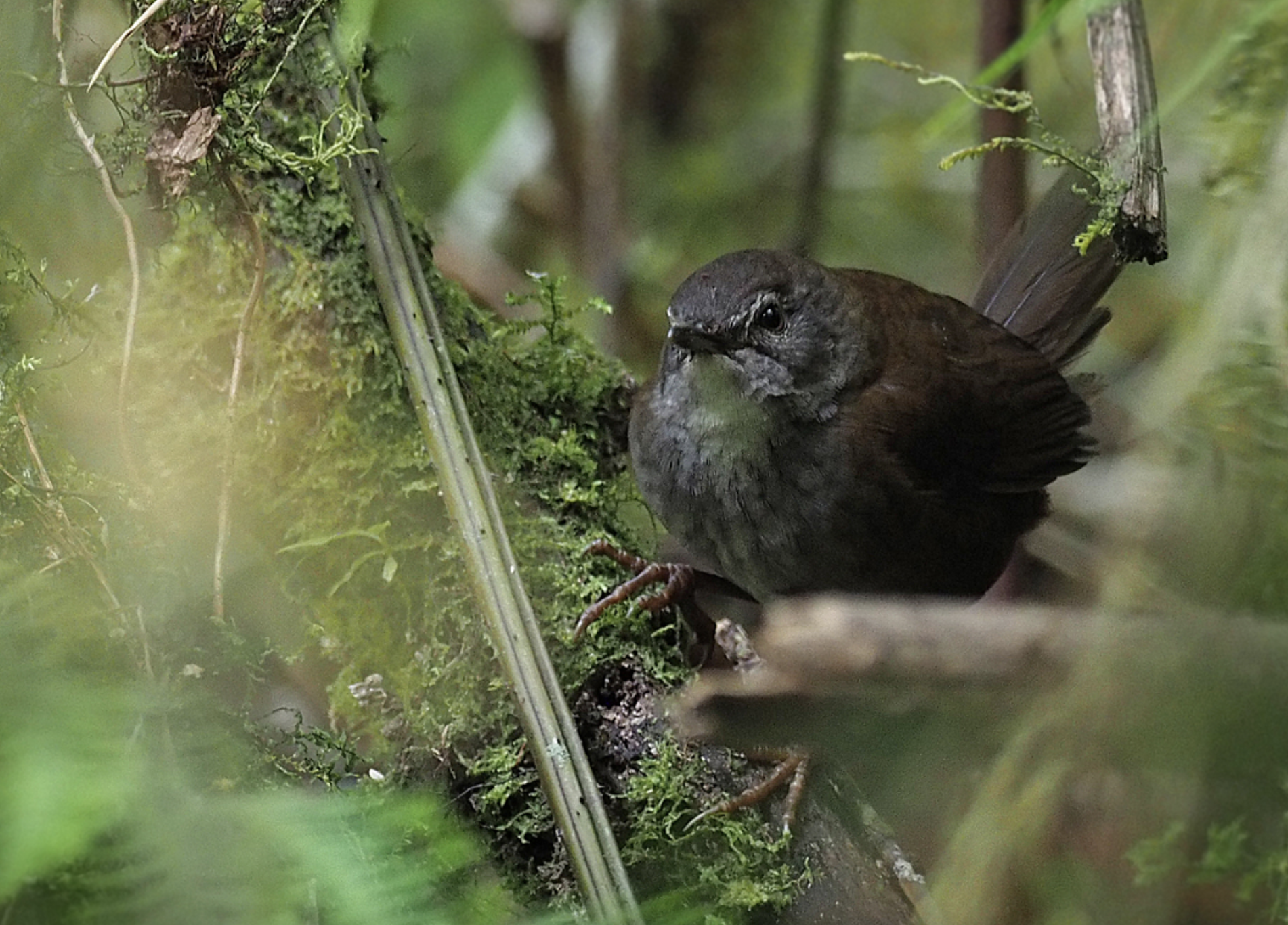
- in Manusela National Park

Scientific classification
- Domain: Eukaryota
- Kingdom: Animalia
- Phylum: Chordata
- Class: Aves
- Order: Passeriformes
- Family: Locustellidae
- Genus: Locustella
- Species: L. musculus

Binomial name
- Locustella musculus (Stresemann, 1914)

= Seram bush warbler =

Species of bird

The Seram bush warbler (Locustella musculus) is a species of Old World warbler in the family Locustellidae. It is endemic to the island Seram in Indonesia where it is found on the forest floor.
