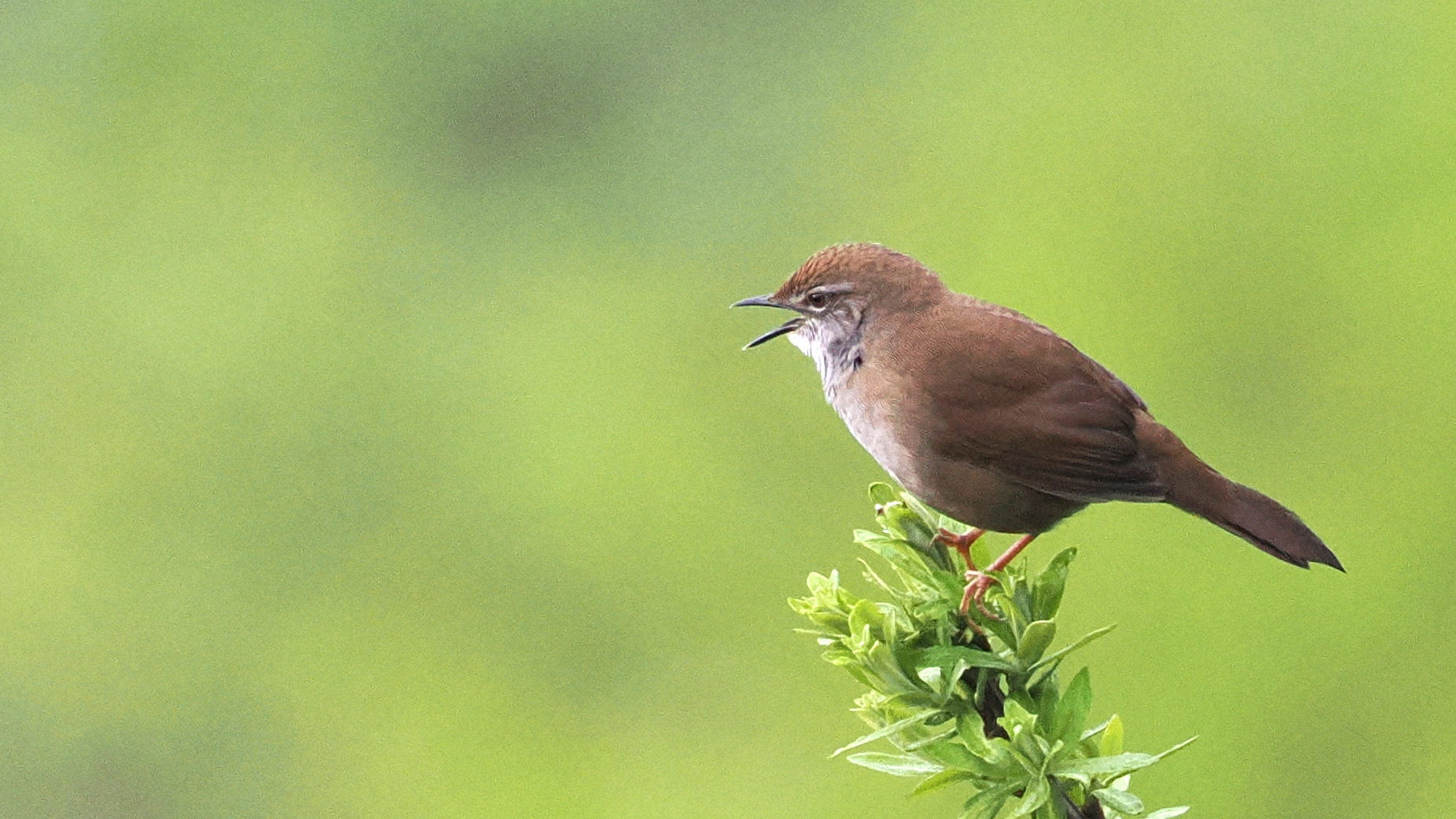

Conservation status
- Least Concern (IUCN 3.1)

Scientific classification
- Kingdom: Animalia
- Phylum: Chordata
- Class: Aves
- Order: Passeriformes
- Family: Locustellidae
- Genus: Locustella
- Species: L. thoracica

Binomial name
- Locustella thoracica (Blyth, 1845)

Synonyms
- Bradypterus thoracica

= Spotted bush warbler =

Species of bird

The spotted bush warbler (Locustella thoracica) is a species of Old World warbler in the family Locustellidae. It is found in the northern Himalayas, Yunnan and central China, in the countries of Bangladesh, Bhutan, China, India, Myanmar and Nepal. Its natural habitat is arboreal forests.
