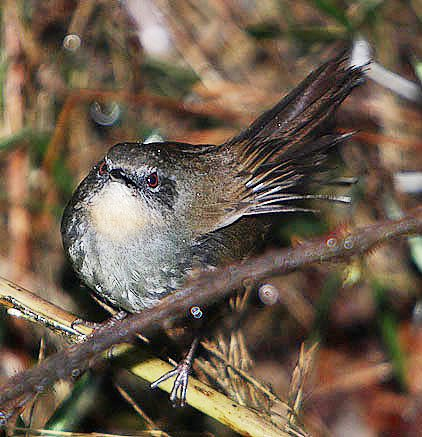
- In Horton Plains, Sri Lanka

Conservation status
- Near Threatened (IUCN 3.1)

Scientific classification
- Kingdom: Animalia
- Phylum: Chordata
- Class: Aves
- Order: Passeriformes
- Family: Locustellidae
- Genus: Elaphrornis; Legge, 1879
- Species: E. palliseri

Binomial name
- Elaphrornis palliseri (Blyth, 1851)

Synonyms
- Bradypterus palliseri

= Sri Lanka bush warbler =

Species of bird

The Sri Lanka bush warbler (Elaphrornis palliseri), also known as Ceylon bush warbler or Palliser's warbler, is an Old World warbler which is an endemic resident breeder in Sri Lanka, where it is the only bush warbler.

== Taxonomy ==
The Sri Lanka bush warbler has sometimes been placed in the genus Bradypterus and a 2018 study confirms that it is a sister to the clade that contains the Bradypterus and Megalurus warblers; it appears to be closely related to that genus, but differs in structure (relatively shorter-tailed and longer-billed), plumage (unmarked) and song. It is monotypic. The species is named after the collector Captain Edward Palliser (1826-1907). Edward and his brother Fred Palliser were both collectors in Sri Lanka. The species was described by Kelaart but published by Edward Blyth in 1851.

== Distribution ==
The Sri Lanka bush warbler is a bird of dense forest undergrowth, often close to water. It is found in the highlands of central Sri Lanka, usually above 1200 m. The nest is built in a shrub, and two eggs are laid.

== Description ==
This is a medium-large warbler at 14 cm. The adult has a plain brown back, pale grey underparts, a broad tail and short wings. There is a weak supercilium, and the throat is tinged orange. The sexes are identical, as with most warblers, but young birds lack the throat colouration.

The Sri Lanka bush warbler is a skulking species which can be very difficult to see. Perhaps the best site is Horton Plains National Park. It keeps low in vegetation and, like most warblers, it is insectivorous.

Males are often only detected by the loud song, which has an explosive queet.
