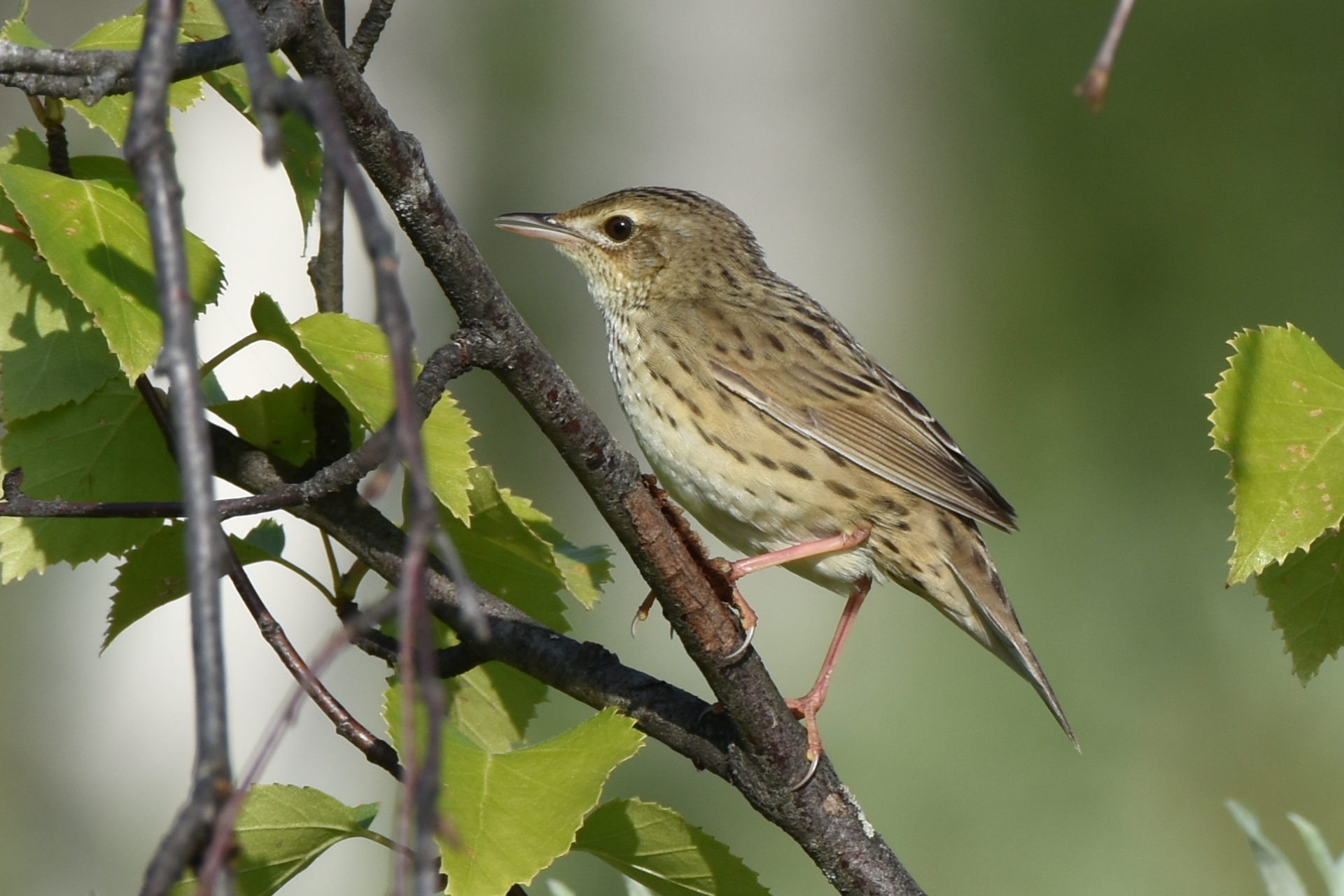

Conservation status
- Least Concern (IUCN 3.1)

Scientific classification
- Kingdom: Animalia
- Phylum: Chordata
- Class: Aves
- Order: Passeriformes
- Family: Locustellidae
- Genus: Locustella
- Species: L. lanceolata

Binomial name
- Locustella lanceolata (Temminck, 1840)
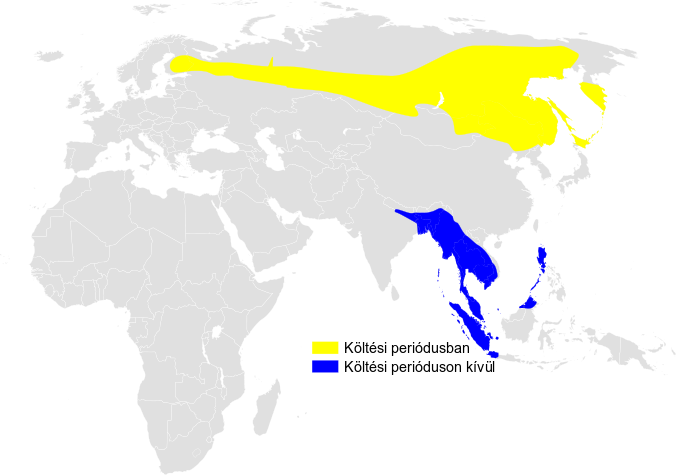
- Distribution of Lanceolated Warbler Breeding Non-breeding

= Lanceolated warbler =

Species of bird

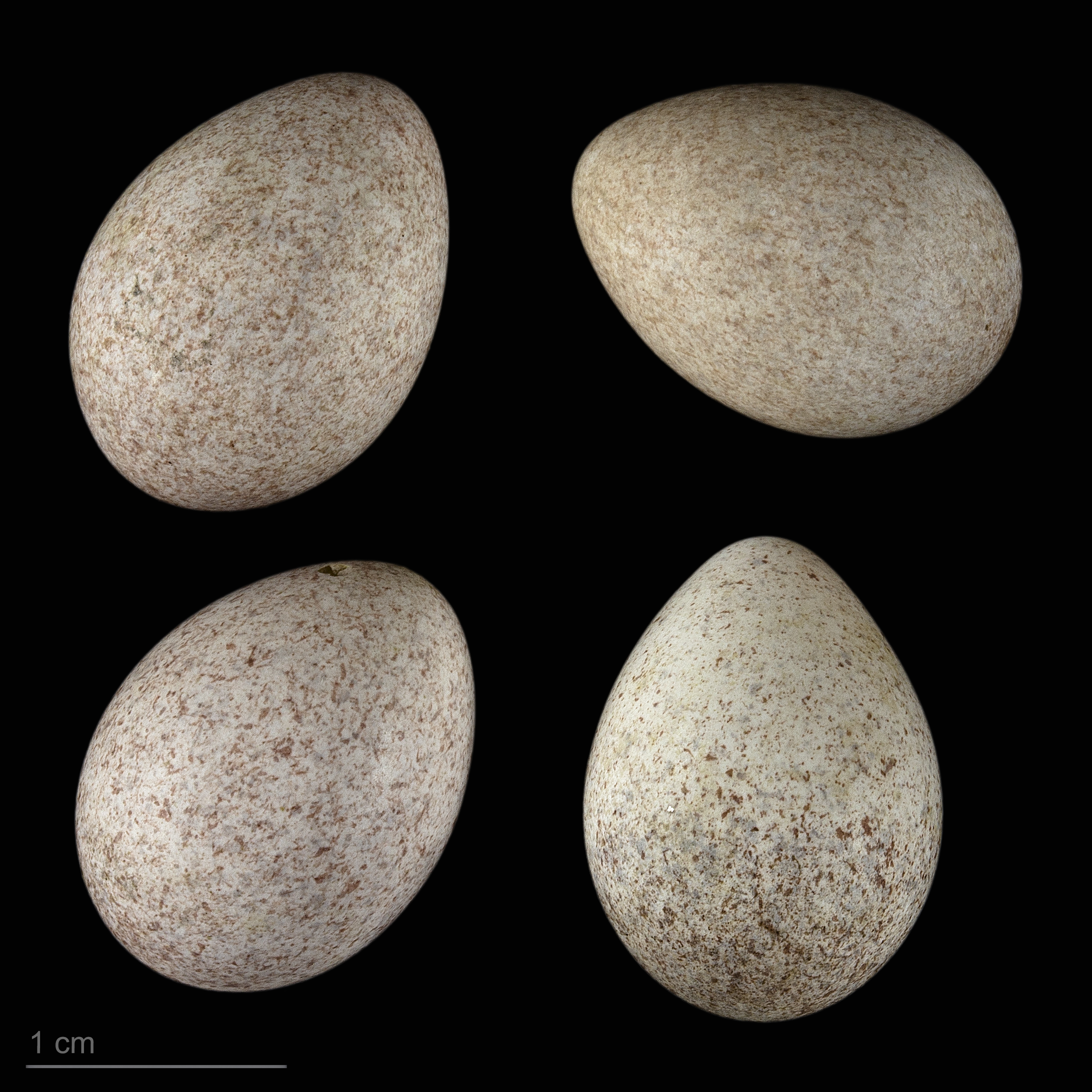
Locustella lanceolata - MHNT

The lanceolated warbler (Locustella lanceolata) is a species of Old World warbler in the genus Locustella. It breeds from northwest European Russia across the Palearctic to northern Hokkaidō, Japan. It is migratory, wintering in Southeast Asia. The genus name Locustella is from Latin and is a diminutive of locusta, "grasshopper". This refers to the song of the common grasshopper warbler and some others in this genus. The specific lanceolata is Latin for "spear-shaped" and refers to the streaks on the breast.

This small passerine bird is a species found in grassland with some thicker shrubby vegetation or trees, often close to water in bogs or wet clearings. Five eggs are laid in a nest in a tussock. This species is a rare vagrant to western Europe. One of the best places to see this skulking species as a vagrant is Fair Isle, Shetland.

This is a small warbler. The adult has a streaked brown back and whitish grey underparts, which have small lance-head like streaks, that are also found on the undertail. The sexes are identical, as with most warblers, but young birds are yellower below. Like most warblers, it is insectivorous.

This is a skulking species which is very difficult to see except sometimes when singing. It creeps through grass and low foliage.

The song is a monotonous mechanical insect-like reeling as in other species in the group, often given at dusk.

There are two subspecies recorded, as L. l. lanceolata (Temminck, 1840) and L. l. hendersonii (Cassin, 1858).
