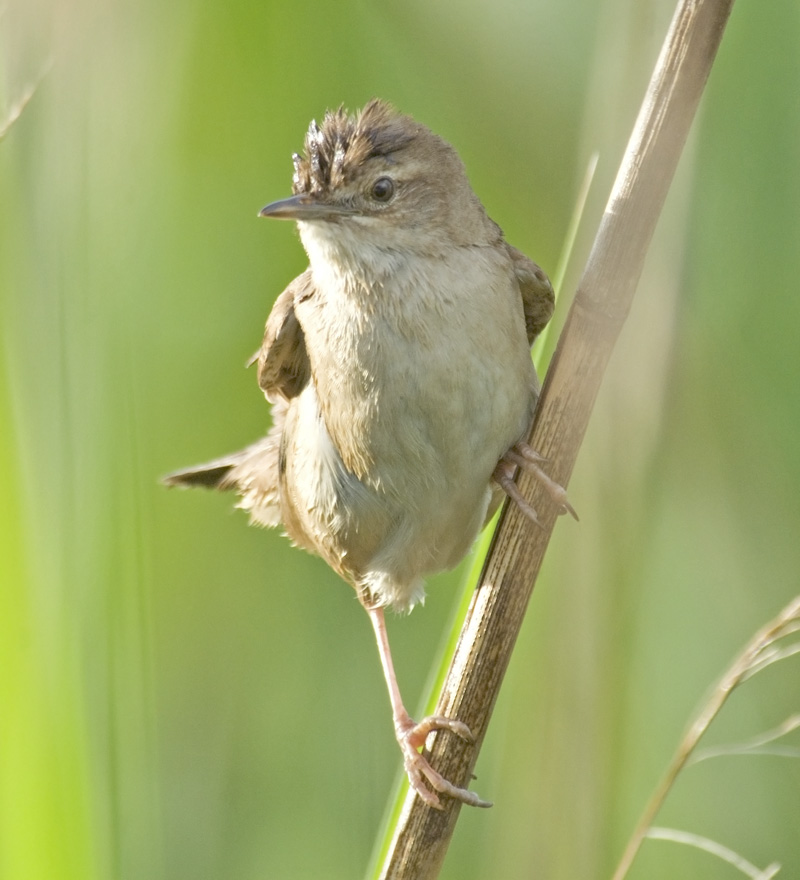
- Savi's warbler (Locustella luscinioides)

Scientific classification
- Kingdom: Animalia
- Phylum: Chordata
- Class: Aves
- Order: Passeriformes
- Family: Locustellidae
- Genus: Locustella; Kaup, 1829

Type species
- Sylvia locustella Latham, 1790

Species
- see text

= Locustella =

Genus of birds

Locustella is a genus of small passerine birds that includes the grasshopper warblers. Formerly placed in the paraphyletic "Old World warbler" assemblage, they are now considered the northernmost representatives of a largely Gondwanan family, the Locustellidae.

These are rather drab brownish "warblers" usually associated with fairly open grassland, shrubs or marshes. Some are streaked, others plain, all are difficult to view. They are insectivorous.

The most characteristic feature of this group is that the song of several species is a mechanical insect-like reeling which gives rise to the group's scientific name.

Species breeding in temperate regions are strongly migratory.

== Taxonomy ==
The genus Locustella was introduced by the German naturalist Johann Jakob Kaup in 1829 with the common grasshopper warbler (Locustella naevia) as the type species. The genus name Locustella is from Latin and is a diminutive of locusta, "grasshopper". Like the English name, this refers to the insect-like song of some species.

The genus contains the following twenty-three species:

Image	Common name	Scientific name
	Lanceolated warbler	Locustella lanceolata
	Brown bush warbler	Locustella luteoventris
	Long-billed bush warbler	Locustella major
	Common grasshopper warbler	Locustella naevia
	Chinese bush warbler	Locustella tacsanowskia
	Bamboo warbler	Locustella alfredi
	River warbler	Locustella fluviatilis
	Savi's warbler	Locustella luscinioides
	Friendly bush warbler	Locustella accentor
	Sulawesi bush warbler	Locustella castanea
	Seram bush warbler	Locustella musculus
	Buru bush warbler	Locustella disturbans
	Long-tailed bush warbler	Locustella caudata
	Baikal bush warbler	Locustella davidi
	Spotted bush warbler	Locustella thoracica
	West Himalayan bush warbler	Locustella kashmirensis
	Taiwan bush warbler	Locustella alishanensis
	Russet bush warbler	Locustella mandelli
	Dalat bush warbler	Locustella idonea
	Benguet bush warbler	Locustella seebohmi
	Javan bush warbler	Locustella montis
	Sichuan bush warbler	Locustella chengi
	Taliabu bush warbler	Locustella portenta

This genus formerly included additional species. A molecular phylogenetic study of the grassbird family Locustellidae published in 2018 found that the genus Locustella consisted of two distinct clades. The genus was split and six species were moved to the newly erected genus Helopsaltes.

A fossil acrocoracoid from the Late Miocene (about 11 mya) of Rudabánya (NE Hungary) is quite similar to this bone in the present genus. Given its rather early age (most Passerida genera are not known until the Pliocene), it is not too certain that it is correctly placed here, but it is highly likely to belong to the Locustellidae, or the Sylvioidea at the least. As the grasshopper warblers are the only known locustellid warblers from Europe, it is still fairly likely that the bone piece belongs to a basal Locustella.
