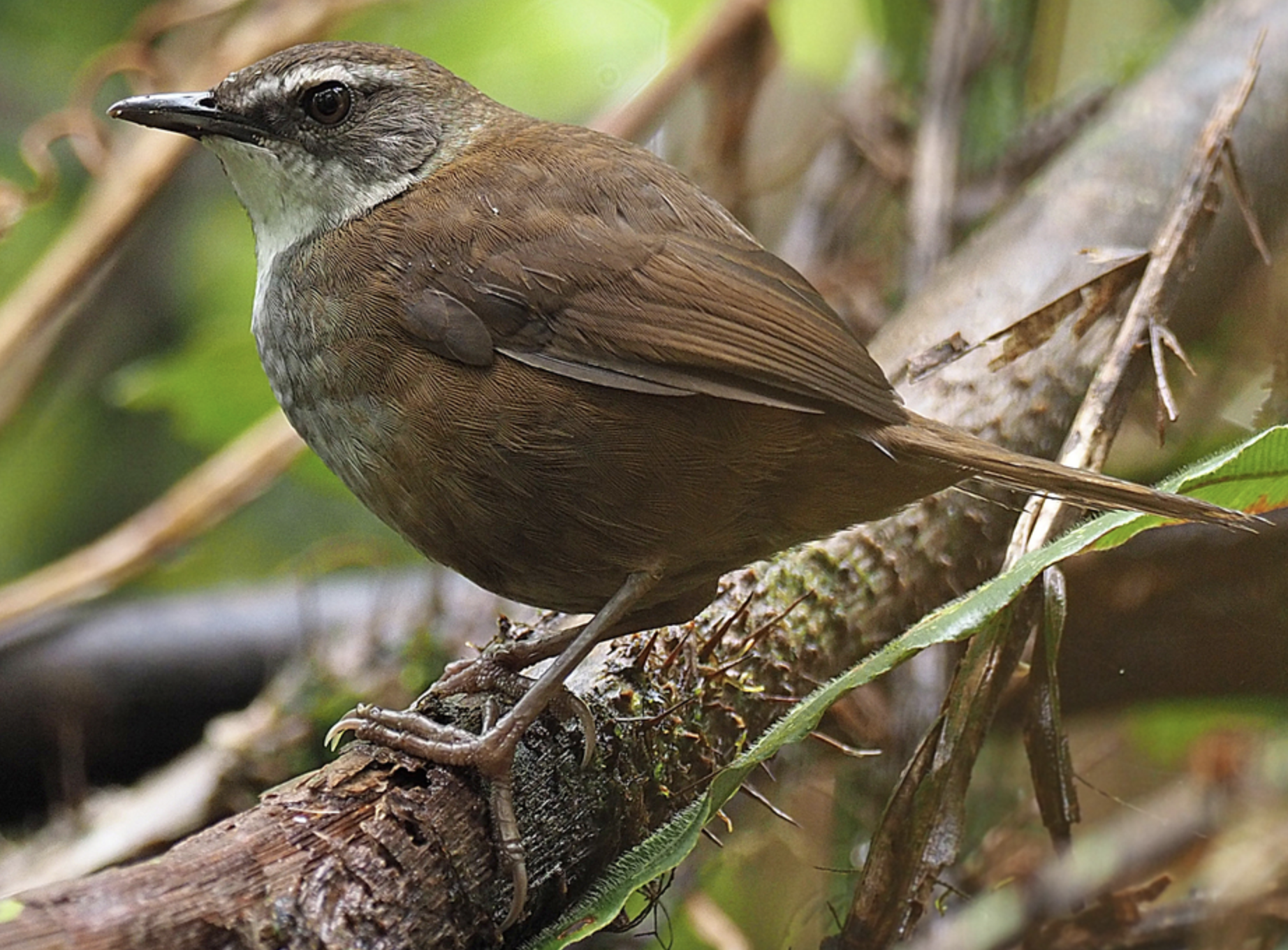

Scientific classification
- Domain: Eukaryota
- Kingdom: Animalia
- Phylum: Chordata
- Class: Aves
- Order: Passeriformes
- Family: Locustellidae
- Genus: Locustella
- Species: L. disturbans

Binomial name
- Locustella disturbans (Hartert, 1900)

= Buru bush warbler =

Species of bird

The Buru bush warbler (Locustella disturbans) is a species of Old World warbler in the family Locustellidae. It is endemic to the island Buru in Indonesia where it is found on the forest floor.
