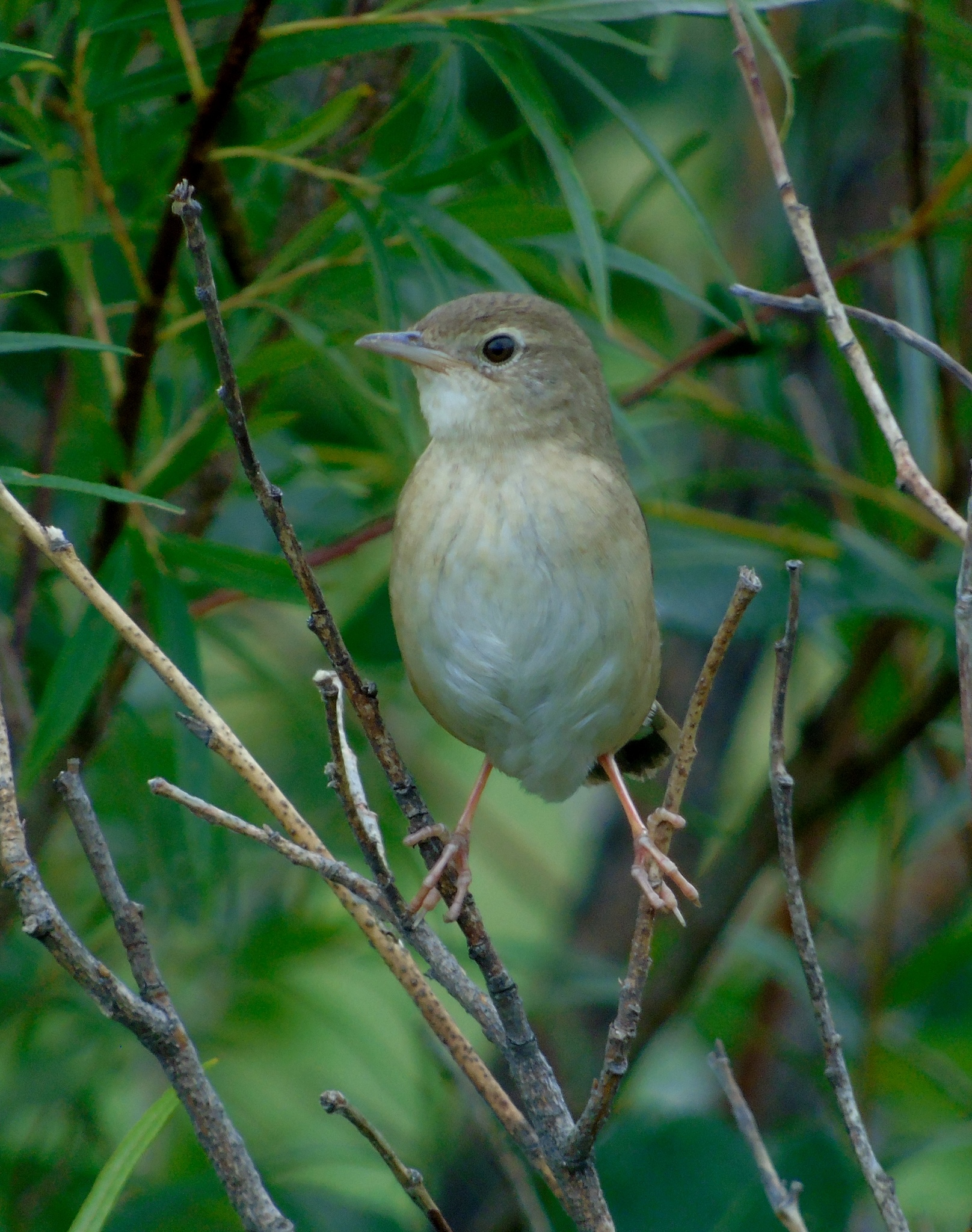
- in Zabaykalsky Krai, Russia

Conservation status
- Least Concern (IUCN 3.1)

Scientific classification
- Kingdom: Animalia
- Phylum: Chordata
- Class: Aves
- Order: Passeriformes
- Family: Locustellidae
- Genus: Locustella
- Species: L. tacsanowskia

Binomial name
- Locustella tacsanowskia R. Swinhoe, 1871

Synonyms
- Bradypterus tacsanowskius

= Chinese bush warbler =

Species of bird

The Chinese bush warbler (Locustella tacsanowskia) is an Old World warbler in the family Locustellidae. The species was first described by Robert Swinhoe in 1871. It breeds in the East Palearctic (East Siberia to Tibet and South China); it winters to Northeast India, Yunnan and Southeast Asia. Its natural habitat is temperate forests.
