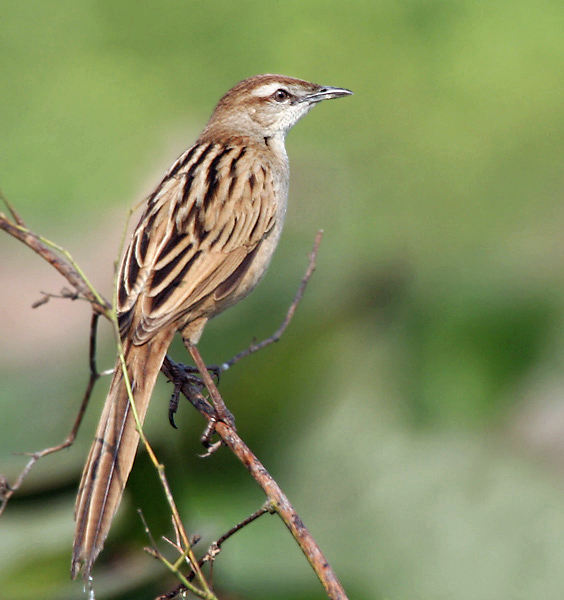
- Striated grassbird (Megalurus palustris)

Scientific classification
- Kingdom: Animalia
- Phylum: Chordata
- Class: Aves
- Order: Passeriformes
- Superfamily: Locustelloidea
- Family: Locustellidae; Bonaparte, 1854

Genera
- see text

Synonyms
- Megaluridae Blyth, 1875

= Locustellidae =

Family of birds

Locustellidae is a recently recognised family of small insectivorous songbirds ("warblers"), formerly placed in the Old World warbler "wastebin" family. It contains the grasshopper warblers, grassbirds, and the Bradypterus "bush warblers". These birds occur mainly in Eurasia, Africa, and the Australian region. The family name is sometimes given as Megaluridae, but Locustellidae has priority.

The name derives from the type genus name Locustella, which is from Latin and is a diminutive of locusta, "grasshopper". Like the English name grasshopper warbler, this refers to the insect-like song of many species of Locustella, most notably the common grasshopper warbler Locustella naevia.

The species are smallish birds with tails that are usually long and pointed; the scientific name of the genus Megalurus in fact means "the large-tailed one" in plain English. They are less wren-like than the typical shrub-warblers (Cettia), but they are similarly drab brownish or buffy all over. They tend to be larger and slimmer than Cettia though, and many have bold dark streaks on wings and/or underside. Most live in scrubland and frequently hunt food by clambering through thick tangled growth or pursuing it on the ground; they are perhaps the most terrestrial of the "warblers". Very unusual for Passeriformes, the beginning of an evolution towards flightlessness is seen in some taxa.

Among the "warbler and babbler" superfamily Sylvioidea, the Locustellidae are closest to the Bernieridae (Malagasy warblers), another recently recognised family. The black-capped donacobius (Donacobius atricapillus), the only species in the monotypic genus Donacobius and the only species in the monogeneric family Donacobiidae, is a South American relative derived from the same ancestral stock as the Locustellidae, and is not a wren as was long believed.

A comprehensive molecular phylogenetic study of the grassbird family Locustellidae published in 2018 found that many of the genera, as then defined, were non-monophyletic. The resulting revision of the genus level taxonomy involved many changes including the resurrection of the genera Poodytes and Cincloramphus as well as the description of a new genus Helopsaltes. The former genera Megalurulus and Buettikoferella become junior synonyms of Cincloramphus.

== Genera ==
The family contains 67 species divided into 11 genera.

- Robsonius – ground warblers (3 species)
- Helopsaltes – grass warblers (6 species)
- Locustella – grasshopper warblers (23 species)
- Bradypterus – megalurid bush warblers (12 species)
- Elaphrornis – Sri Lanka bush warbler
- Schoenicola – wide-tailed grassbirds (2 species)
- Poodytes – grassbirds (5 species including one extinct)
- Malia – malia
- Cincloramphus – (12 species)
- Megalurus – striated grassbird
- Catriscus – fan-tailed grassbird

The relationships between the genera is shown in the following cladogram. It is based on a 2018 study by Per Alström and coworkers.

- Locustellidae
  - Robsonius – ground warblers (3 species)
  - - - Helopsaltes – grass warblers (6 species)
      - Locustella – grasshopper warblers (23 species)
    - - - Poodytes – grassbirds (5 species)
        - - Malia – malia
          - Cincloramphus – (12 species)
      - - Elaphrornis – Sri Lanka bush warbler
        - - Catriscus – fan-tailed grassbird
          - - Megalurus – striated grassbird
            - Bradypterus – (12 species)
