= List of birds of North Korea =

This is a list of the bird species recorded in North Korea. The avifauna of North Korea include a total of 386 species, one of which is introduced.

This list's taxonomic treatment (designation and sequence of orders, families and species) and nomenclature (common and scientific names) follow the conventions of The Clements Checklist of Birds of the World, 2022 edition. The family accounts at the beginning of each heading reflect this taxonomy, as do the species counts found in each family account.

The following tag has been used to highlight extirpated species. The commonly occurring native species are untagged.

- (A) Accidental - a species that rarely or accidentally occurs in North Korea
- (I) Introduced - a species introduced to North Korea as a consequence, direct or indirect, of human actions
- (Ex) Extirpated - a species that no longer occurs in North Korea although populations exist elsewhere

== Ducks, geese, and waterfowl ==
Order: Anseriformes Family: Anatidae

Anatidae includes the ducks and most duck-like waterfowl, such as geese and swans. These birds are adapted to an aquatic existence with webbed feet, flattened bills, and feathers that are excellent at shedding water due to an oily coating.

- Snow goose (흰기러기), Anser caerulescens (A)
- Swan goose (물개리), Anser cygnoides
- Greater white-fronted goose (작은기러기(쇠기러기)), Anser albifrons
- Lesser white-fronted goose (흰이마기러기[흰이마쇠기러기]), Anser erythropus (A)
- Taiga bean-goose (큰기러기), Anser fabalis
- Tundra bean-goose (큰기러기), Anser serrirostris
- Brant (검은기러기), Branta bernicla (A)
- Cackling goose (카나다기러기), Branta hutchinsii (A)
- Mute swan (흑고니), Cygnus olor (A)
- Tundra swan (고니[곤이]), Cygnus columbianus
- Whooper swan (큰고니), Cygnus cygnus
- Ruddy shelduck (진경이), Tadorna ferruginea (A)
- Common shelduck (꽃진경이), Tadorna tadorna (A)
- Mandarin duck (원앙), Aix galericulata
- Baikal teal (태극오리), Sibirionetta formosa
- Garganey (발구지[알락발구지]), Spatula querquedula
- Northern shoveler (넙적부리오리), Spatula clypeata
- Gadwall (알락오리), Mareca strepera
- Falcated duck (청머리오리), Mareca falcata
- Eurasian wigeon (홍머리오리, 알숭오리), Mareca penelope
- Eastern spot-billed duck (흰뺨검둥오리), Anas zonorhyncha
- Mallard (청뒹오리(청동오리)), Anas platyrhynchos
- Northern pintail (가창오리), Anas acuta
- Green-winged teal (되강오리[발구지]), Anas crecca
- Common pochard (흰쭉지오리[붉은머리검은가슴]), Aythya ferina
- Baer's pochard (푸른머리흰쭉지오리[푸른머리흰눈, 붉은가슴흰쭉지]), Aythya baeri (A)
- Tufted duck (검은댕기흰쭉지오리[검은댕기흰쭉지]), Aythya fuligula
- Greater scaup (검은머리흰쭉지오리[검은머리알숭오리]), Aythya marila
- Harlequin duck (흰무늬오리), Histrionicus histrionicus
- Surf scoter, Melanitta perspicillata (A)
- Stejneger's scoter, Melanitta stejnegeri
- Black scoter, Melanitta americana
- Long-tailed duck (바다꿩[담북오리]), Clangula hyemalis
- Common goldeneye (흰뺨오리), Bucephala clangula
- Smew, Mergellus albellus
- Common merganser (갯비오리), Mergus merganser
- Red-breasted merganser (바다비오리), Mergus serrator
- Scaly-sided merganser (비오리[호사비오리]), Mergus squamatus (A)

== Pheasants, grouse, and allies ==
Order: Galliformes Family: Phasianidae

The Phasianidae are a family of terrestrial birds. In general, they are plump (although they vary in size) and have broad, relatively short wings.

- Hazel grouse (들꿩), Tetrastes bonasia
- Black grouse (멧닭[메'닭]), Lyrurus tetrix
- Ring-necked pheasant (꿩), Phasianus colchicus
- Japanese quail (메추리), Coturnix japonica

== Grebes ==
Order: Podicipediformes Family: Podicipedidae

Grebes are small to medium-large freshwater diving birds. They have lobed toes and are excellent swimmers and divers. However, they have their feet placed far back on the body, making them quite ungainly on land.

- Little grebe (농병아리), Tachybaptus ruficollis
- Horned grebe (귀농병아리), Podiceps auritus
- Red-necked grebe (붉은목농병아리), Podiceps grisegena
- Great crested grebe (뿔논병아리), Podiceps cristatus
- Eared grebe (검은목농병아리), Podiceps nigricollis

== Pigeons and doves ==
Order: Columbiformes Family: Columbidae

Pigeons and doves are stout-bodied birds with short necks and short slender bills with a fleshy cere.

- Rock pigeon, Columba livia (I)
- Hill pigeon (낭비들기[굴비들기, 양비들기, 낭비둘기]), Columba rupestris
- Oriental turtle-dove, Streptopelia orientalis
- Eurasian collared-dove, Streptopelia decaocto (A)
- Red collared-dove (검은목도리비들기[검은목도리비둘기]), Streptopelia tranquebarica (A)

== Sandgrouse ==
Order: Pterocliformes Family: Pteroclidae

Sandgrouse have small, pigeon like heads and necks, but sturdy compact bodies. They have long pointed wings and sometimes tails and a fast direct flight. Flocks fly to watering holes at dawn and dusk. Their legs are feathered down to the toes.

- Pallas's sandgrouse (모래닭[사계]), Syrrhaptes paradoxus (A)

== Bustards ==
Order: Otidiformes Family: Otididae

Bustards are large terrestrial birds mainly associated with dry open country and steppes in the Old World. They are omnivorous and nest on the ground. They walk steadily on strong legs and big toes, pecking for food as they go. They have long broad wings with "fingered" wingtips and striking patterns in flight. Many have interesting mating displays.

- Great bustard (너화), Otis tarda (Ex)

== Cuckoos ==
Order: Cuculiformes Family: Cuculidae

The family Cuculidae includes cuckoos, roadrunners and anis. These birds are of variable size with slender bodies, long tails and strong legs. The Old World cuckoos are brood parasites.

- Northern hawk-cuckoo (새매뻐꾸기), Hierococcyx hyperythrus
- Lesser cuckoo (두견), Cuculus poliocephalus
- Indian cuckoo (검은등뻐꾸기[검은줄발이뻐꾸기]), Cuculus micropterus
- Common cuckoo (뻐꾸기), Cuculus canorus
- Oriental cuckoo, Cuculus optatus

== Nightjars and allies ==
Order: Caprimulgiformes Family: Caprimulgidae

Nightjars are medium-sized nocturnal birds that usually nest on the ground. They have long wings, short legs and very short bills. Most have small feet, of little use for walking, and long pointed wings. Their soft plumage is camouflaged to resemble bark or leaves.

- Gray nightjar (쏙독새), Caprimulgus jotaka

== Swifts ==
Order: Caprimulgiformes Family: Apodidae

Swifts are small birds which spend the majority of their lives flying. These birds have very short legs and never settle voluntarily on the ground, perching instead only on vertical surfaces. Many swifts have long swept-back wings which resemble a crescent or boomerang.

- White-throated needletail (후리새), Hirundapus caudacutus
- Pacific swift (칼새), Apus pacificus

== Rails, gallinules, and coots ==
Order: Gruiformes Family: Rallidae

Rallidae is a large family of small to medium-sized birds which includes the rails, crakes, coots and gallinules. Typically they inhabit dense vegetation in damp environments near lakes, swamps or rivers. In general they are shy and secretive birds, making them difficult to observe. Most species have strong legs and long toes which are well adapted to soft uneven surfaces. They tend to have short, rounded wings and to be weak fliers.

- Brown-cheeked rail, Rallus indicus
- Eurasian moorhen (물닭), Gallinula chloropus
- Eurasian coot (큰물닭), Fulica atra
- Watercock (뜸부기), Gallicrex cinerea
- White-breasted waterhen (흰배물닭), Amaurornis phoenicurus (A)
- Ruddy-breasted crake, Zapornia fusca
- Band-bellied crake, Zapornia paykullii (A)
- Baillon's crake, Zapornia pusilla (A)
- Swinhoe's rail (작은물병아리), Coturnicops exquisitus (A)

== Cranes ==
Order: Gruiformes Family: Gruidae

Cranes are large, long-legged and long-necked birds. Unlike the similar-looking but unrelated herons, cranes fly with necks outstretched, not pulled back. Most have elaborate and noisy courting displays or "dances".

- White-naped crane (재두루미), Antigone vipio
- Common crane (검은두루미), Grus grus
- Hooded crane (흰목검은두루미[개두루미]), Grus monacha
- Red-crowned crane (흰두루미[백두루미, 학]), Grus japonensis

== Stilts and avocets ==
Order: Charadriiformes Family: Recurvirostridae

Recurvirostridae is a family of large wading birds, which includes the avocets and stilts. The avocets have long legs and long up-curved bills. The stilts have extremely long legs and long, thin, straight bills.

- Black-winged stilt (긴다리도요), Himantopus himantopus (A)
- Pied avocet, Recurvirostra avosetta (A)

== Oystercatchers ==
Order: Charadriiformes Family: Haematopodidae

The oystercatchers are large and noisy plover-like birds, with strong bills used for smashing or prising open molluscs.

- Eurasian oystercatcher, Haematopus ostralegus

== Plovers and lapwings ==
Order: Charadriiformes Family: Charadriidae

The family Charadriidae includes the plovers, dotterels and lapwings. They are small to medium-sized birds with compact bodies, short, thick necks and long, usually pointed, wings. They are found in open country worldwide, mostly in habitats near water.

- Black-bellied plover, Pluvialis squatarola
- Pacific golden-plover, Pluvialis fulva
- Northern lapwing, Vanellus vanellus
- Gray-headed lapwing, Vanellus cinereus (A)
- Lesser sand-plover, Charadrius mongolus
- Greater sand-plover, Charadrius leschenaultii (A)
- Kentish plover, Charadrius alexandrinus
- Common ringed plover, Charadrius hiaticula (A)
- Long-billed plover, Charadrius placidus
- Little ringed plover, Charadrius dubius

== Sandpipers and allies ==
Order: Charadriiformes Family: Scolopacidae

Scolopacidae is a large diverse family of small to medium-sized shorebirds including the sandpipers, curlews, godwits, shanks, tattlers, woodcocks, snipes, dowitchers and phalaropes. The majority of these species eat small invertebrates picked out of the mud or soil. Variation in length of legs and bills enables multiple species to feed in the same habitat, particularly on the coast, without direct competition for food.

- Whimbrel, Numenius phaeopus
- Little curlew, Numenius minutus (A)
- Far Eastern curlew, Numenius madagascariensis
- Eurasian curlew, Numenius arquata
- Bar-tailed godwit, Limosa lapponica
- Black-tailed godwit, Limosa limosa
- Ruddy turnstone, Arenaria interpres
- Great knot, Calidris tenuirostris
- Red knot, Calidris canutus
- Ruff, Calidris alba (A)
- Broad-billed sandpiper, Calidris falcinellus
- Sharp-tailed sandpiper, Calidris acuminata
- Curlew sandpiper, Calidris ferruginea (A)
- Temminck's stint, Calidris temminckii
- Long-toed stint, Calidris subminuta (A)
- Spoon-billed sandpiper, Calidris pygmeus (A)
- Red-necked stint, Calidris ruficollis
- Sanderling, Calidris alba (A)
- Dunlin, Calidris alpina
- Little stint, Calidris minuta (A)
- Pectoral sandpiper, Calidris melanotos (A)
- Western sandpiper, Calidris mauri (A)
- Eurasian woodcock, Scolopax rusticola
- Solitary snipe, Gallinago solitaria
- Common snipe, Gallinago gallinago
- Pin-tailed snipe, Gallinago stenura (A)
- Swinhoe's snipe, Gallinago megala (A)
- Terek sandpiper, Xenus cinereus
- Red-necked phalarope, Phalaropus lobatus (A)
- Common sandpiper, Actitis hypoleucos
- Green sandpiper, Tringa ochropus
- Gray-tailed tattler, Tringa brevipes
- Wandering tattler, Tringa incana (A)
- Spotted redshank, Tringa erythropus
- Common greenshank, Tringa nebularia
- Nordmann's greenshank, Tringa guttifer (A)
- Marsh sandpiper, Tringa stagnatilis (A)
- Wood sandpiper, Tringa glareola
- Common redshank, Tringa totanus

== Buttonquail ==
Order: Charadriiformes Family: Turnicidae

The buttonquail are small, drab, running birds which resemble the true quails. The female is the brighter of the sexes and initiates courtship. The male incubates the eggs and tends the young.

- Yellow-legged buttonquail, Turnix tanki

== Pratincoles and coursers ==
Order: Charadriiformes Family: Glareolidae

Glareolidae is a family of wading birds comprising the pratincoles, which have short legs, long pointed wings and long forked tails, and the coursers, which have long legs, short wings and long, pointed bills which curve downwards.

- Oriental pratincole, Glareola maldivarum (A)

== Auks, murres, and puffins ==
Order: Charadriiformes Family: Alcidae

Alcids are superficially similar to penguins due to their black-and-white colours, their upright posture and some of their habits, however they are not related to the penguins and differ in being able to fly. Auks live on the open sea, only deliberately coming ashore to nest.

- Common murre, Uria aalge
- Spectacled guillemot, Cepphus carbo
- Long-billed murrelet, Brachyramphus perdix (A)
- Ancient murrelet, Synthliboramphus antiquus
- Rhinoceros auklet, Cerorhinca monocerata

== Gulls, terns, and skimmers ==
Order: Charadriiformes Family: Laridae

Laridae is a family of medium to large seabirds, the gulls, terns, and skimmers. Gulls are typically grey or white, often with black markings on the head or wings. They have stout, longish bills and webbed feet. Terns are a group of generally medium to large seabirds typically with grey or white plumage, often with black markings on the head. Most terns hunt fish by diving but some pick insects off the surface of fresh water. Terns are generally long-lived birds, with several species known to live in excess of 30 years.

- Black-legged kittiwake, Rissa tridactyla (A)
- Saunders's gull, Chroicocephalus saundersi
- Black-headed gull, Chroicocephalus ridibundus
- Relict gull, Ichthyaetus relictus (A)
- Black-tailed gull, Larus crassirostris
- Common gull, Larus canus
- Herring gull, Larus argentatus
- Lesser black-backed gull, Larus fuscus
- Slaty-backed gull, Larus schistisagus (A)
- Glaucous gull, Larus hyperboreus
- Little tern, Sternula albifrons
- Caspian tern, Hydroprogne caspia (A)
- White-winged tern, Chlidonias leucopterus (A)
- Whiskered tern, Chlidonias hybrida (A)
- Common tern, Sterna hirundo

== Loons ==
Order: Gaviiformes Family: Gaviidae

Loons, known as divers in Europe, are a group of aquatic birds found in many parts of North America and northern Europe. They are the size of a large duck or small goose, which they somewhat resemble when swimming, but to which they are completely unrelated. There are 5 species worldwide and 4 species which occur in North Korea.

- Red-throated loon, Gavia stellata (A)
- Arctic loon, Gavia arctica
- Pacific loon, Gavia pacifica (A)
- Yellow-billed loon, Gavia adamsii (A)

== Shearwaters and petrels ==
Order: Procellariiformes Family: Procellariidae

The procellariids are the main group of medium-sized "true petrels", characterised by united nostrils with medium septum and a long outer functional primary.

- Streaked shearwater, Calonectris leucomelas
- Flesh-footed shearwater, Ardenna carneipes (A)
- Short-tailed shearwater, Ardenna tenuirostris (A)

== Storks ==
Order: Ciconiiformes Family: Ciconiidae

Storks are large, long-legged, long-necked, wading birds with long, stout bills. Storks are mute, but bill-clattering is an important mode of communication at the nest. Their nests can be large and may be reused for many years. Many species are migratory.

- Black stork, Ciconia nigra
- Oriental stork, Ciconia boyciana (A)

== Frigatebirds ==
Order: Suliformes Family: Fregatidae

Frigatebirds are large seabirds usually found over tropical oceans. They are large, black-and-white or completely black, with long wings and deeply forked tails. The males have coloured inflatable throat pouches. They do not swim or walk and cannot take off from a flat surface. Having the largest wingspan-to-body-weight ratio of any bird, they are essentially aerial, able to stay aloft for more than a week.

- Lesser frigatebird, Fregata ariel (A)

== Cormorants and shags ==
Order: Suliformes Family: Phalacrocoracidae

Phalacrocoracidae is a family of medium to large coastal, fish-eating seabirds that includes cormorants and shags. Plumage colouration varies, with the majority having mainly dark plumage, some species being black-and-white and a few being colourful.

- Pelagic cormorant (까막가마우지), Urile pelagicus
- Great cormorant, Phalacrocorax carbo
- Japanese cormorant, Phalacrocorax capillatus

== Pelicans ==
Order: Pelecaniformes Family: Pelecanidae

Pelicans are large water birds with a distinctive pouch under their beak. As with other members of the order Pelecaniformes, they have webbed feet with four toes.

- Dalmatian pelican, Pelecanus crispus (A)

== Herons, egrets, and bitterns ==
Order: Pelecaniformes Family: Ardeidae

The family Ardeidae contains the bitterns, herons, and egrets. Herons and egrets are medium to large wading birds with long necks and legs. Bitterns tend to be shorter necked and more wary. Members of Ardeidae fly with their necks retracted, unlike other long-necked birds such as storks, ibises and spoonbills.

- Great bittern, Botaurus stellaris
- Yellow bittern, Ixobrychus sinensis
- Schrenck's bittern, Ixobrychus eurhythmus
- Gray heron, Ardea cinerea
- Purple heron, Ardea purpurea
- Great egret, Ardea alba
- Intermediate egret, Ardea intermedia (A)
- Chinese egret, Egretta eulophotes
- Little egret, Egretta garzetta
- Pacific reef-heron, Egretta sacra (A)
- Cattle egret, Bubulcus ibis (A)
- Chinese pond-heron, Ardeola bacchus (A)
- Striated heron, Butorides striata
- Black-crowned night-heron, Nycticorax nycticorax (A)

== Ibises and spoonbills ==
Order: Pelecaniformes Family: Threskiornithidae

Threskiornithidae is a family of large terrestrial and wading birds which includes the ibises and spoonbills. They have long, broad wings with 11 primary and about 20 secondary feathers. They are strong fliers and despite their size and weight, very capable soarers.

- Crested ibis, Nipponia nippon (Ex)
- Eurasian spoonbill, Platalea leucorodia (A)
- Black-faced spoonbill, Platalea minor

== Osprey ==
Order: Accipitriformes Family: Pandionidae

The family Pandionidae contains only one species, the osprey. The osprey is a medium-large raptor which is a specialist fish-eater with a worldwide distribution.

- Osprey, Pandion haliaetus

== Hawks, eagles, and kites ==
Order: Accipitriformes Family: Accipitridae

Accipitridae is a family of birds of prey, which includes hawks, eagles, kites, harriers and Old World vultures. These birds have powerful hooked beaks for tearing flesh from their prey, strong legs, powerful talons and keen eyesight.

- Bearded vulture, Gypaetus barbatus (A)
- Oriental honey-buzzard, Pernis ptilorhynchus (A)
- Cinereous vulture, Aegypius monachus (A)
- Steppe eagle, Aquila nipalensis (A)
- Imperial eagle, Aquila heliaca
- Golden eagle, Aquila chrysaetos
- Gray-faced buzzard, Butastur indicus
- Eastern marsh-harrier, Circus spilonotus (A)
- Hen harrier, Circus cyaneus
- Pied harrier, Circus melanoleucos
- Chinese sparrowhawk, Accipiter soloensis
- Japanese sparrowhawk, Accipiter gularis
- Eurasian sparrowhawk, Accipiter nisus
- Northern goshawk, Accipiter gentilis
- Black kite, Milvus migrans
- White-tailed eagle, Haliaeetus albicilla
- Steller's sea-eagle, Haliaeetus pelagicus (A)
- Rough-legged hawk, Buteo lagopus
- Eastern buzzard, Buteo japonicus
- Upland buzzard, Buteo hemilasius

== Owls ==
Order: Strigiformes Family: Strigidae

The typical owls are small to large solitary nocturnal birds of prey. They have large forward-facing eyes and ears, a hawk-like beak and a conspicuous circle of feathers around each eye called a facial disk.

- Japanese scops-owl, Otus semitorques
- Oriental scops-owl, Otus sunia
- Eurasian eagle-owl, Bubo bubo
- Northern hawk owl, Surnia ulula (A)
- Little owl, Athene noctua (A)
- Himalayan owl, Strix nivicolum
- Ural owl, Strix uralensis (A)
- Long-eared owl, Asio otus
- Short-eared owl, Asio flammeus
- Brown boobook, Ninox scutulata
- Northern boobook, Ninox japonica

== Hoopoes ==
Order: Bucerotiformes Family: Upupidae

Hoopoes have black, white and orangey-pink colouring with a large erectile crest on their head.

- Eurasian hoopoe, Upupa epops

== Kingfishers ==
Order: Coraciiformes Family: Alcedinidae

Kingfishers are medium-sized birds with large heads, long, pointed bills, short legs and stubby tails.

- Common kingfisher, Alcedo atthis
- Ruddy kingfisher, Halcyon coromanda
- Black-capped kingfisher, Halcyon pileata
- Crested kingfisher, Megaceryle lugubris (A)

== Rollers ==
Order: Coraciiformes Family: Coraciidae

Rollers resemble crows in size and build, but are more closely related to the kingfishers and bee-eaters. They share the colourful appearance of those groups with blues and browns predominating. The two inner front toes are connected, but the outer toe is not.

- Dollarbird, Eurystomus orientalis

== Woodpeckers ==
Order: Piciformes Family: Picidae

Woodpeckers are small to medium-sized birds with chisel-like beaks, short legs, stiff tails and long tongues used for capturing insects. Some species have feet with two toes pointing forward and two backward, while several species have only three toes. Many woodpeckers have the habit of tapping noisily on tree trunks with their beaks.

- Eurasian wryneck, Jynx torquilla (A)
- Eurasian three-toed woodpecker, Picoides tridactylus
- Gray-capped pygmy woodpecker, Yungipicus canicapillus
- Japanese pygmy woodpecker, Yungipicus kizuki
- Rufous-bellied woodpecker, Dendrocopos hyperythrus (A)
- White-backed woodpecker, Dendrocopos leucotos
- Great spotted woodpecker, Dendrocopos major
- Lesser spotted woodpecker, Dryobates minor
- Gray-headed woodpecker, Picus canus
- White-bellied woodpecker, Dryocopus javensis (A)
- Black woodpecker, Dryocopus martius

== Falcons and caracaras ==
Order: Falconiformes Family: Falconidae

Falconidae is a family of diurnal birds of prey. They differ from hawks, eagles and kites in that they kill with their beaks instead of their talons. T

- Eurasian kestrel, Falco tinnunculus
- Amur falcon, Falco amurensis
- Merlin, Falco columbarius
- Eurasian hobby, Falco subbuteo
- Peregrine falcon, Falco peregrinus

== Pittas ==
Order: Passeriformes Family: Pittidae

Pittas are medium-sized by passerine standards and are stocky, with fairly long, strong legs, short tails and stout bills. Many are brightly coloured. They spend the majority of their time on wet forest floors, eating snails, insects and similar invertebrates.

- Fairy pitta, Pitta nympha

== Cuckooshrikes ==
Order: Passeriformes Family: Campephagidae

The cuckooshrikes are small to medium-sized passerine birds. They are predominantly greyish with white and black, although some species are brightly coloured.

- Ashy minivet, Pericrocotus divaricatus

== Old World orioles ==
Order: Passeriformes Family: Oriolidae

The Old World orioles are colourful passerine birds. They are not related to the New World orioles.

- Black-naped oriole, Oriolus chinensis

== Drongos ==
Order: Passeriformes Family: Dicruridae

The drongos are mostly black or dark grey in colour, sometimes with metallic tints. They have long forked tails, and some Asian species have elaborate tail decorations. They have short legs and sit very upright when perched, like a shrike. They flycatch or take prey from the ground.

- Black drongo, Dicrurus macrocercus (A)
- Ashy drongo, Dicrurus leucophaeus (A)

== Monarch flycatchers ==
Order: Passeriformes Family: Monarchidae

The monarch flycatchers are small to medium-sized insectivorous passerines which hunt by flycatching.

- Japanese paradise-flycatcher, Terpsiphone atrocaudata
- Amur paradise-flycatcher, Terpsiphone incei

== Shrikes ==
Order: Passeriformes Family: Laniidae

Shrikes are passerine birds known for their habit of catching other birds and small animals and impaling the uneaten portions of their bodies on thorns. A typical shrike's beak is hooked, like a bird of prey.

- Tiger shrike, Lanius tigrinus
- Bull-headed shrike, Lanius bucephalus
- Brown shrike, Lanius cristatus
- Northern shrike, Lanius borealis (A)
- Chinese gray shrike, Lanius sphenocercus

== Crows, jays, and magpies ==
Order: Passeriformes Family: Corvidae

The family Corvidae includes crows, ravens, jays, choughs, magpies, treepies, nutcrackers and ground jays. Corvids are above average in size among the Passeriformes, and some of the larger species show high levels of intelligence.

- Eurasian jay, Garrulus glandarius
- Azure-winged magpie, Cyanopica cyana
- Oriental magpie, Pica serica
- Eurasian nutcracker, Nucifraga caryocatactes
- Daurian jackdaw, Corvus dauuricus
- Rook, Corvus frugilegus
- Carrion crow, Corvus corone
- Large-billed crow, Corvus macrorhynchos
- Common raven, Corvus corax (A)

== Tits, chickadees and titmice ==
Order: Passeriformes Family: Paridae

The Paridae are mainly small stocky woodland species with short stout bills. Some have crests. They are adaptable birds, with a mixed diet including seeds and insects.

- Coal tit, Periparus ater
- Varied tit, Sittiparus varius
- Marsh tit, Poecile palustris
- Willow tit, Poecile montana
- Japanese tit, Parus minor

== Penduline-tits ==
Order: Passeriformes Family: Remizidae

The penduline-tits are a group of small passerine birds related to the true tits. They are insectivores.

- Chinese penduline-tit (곧은부리박새[스윈호박새]), Remiz consobrinus

== Larks ==
Order: Passeriformes Family: Alaudidae

Larks are small terrestrial birds with often extravagant songs and display flights. Most larks are fairly dull in appearance. Their food is insects and seeds.

- Greater short-toed lark, Calandrella brachydactyla (A)
- Asian short-toed lark, Alaudala cheleensis
- Eurasian skylark, Alauda arvensis
- Crested lark, Galerida cristata

== Reed warblers and allies ==
Order: Passeriformes Family: Acrocephalidae

The members of this family are usually rather large for "warblers". Most are rather plain olivaceous brown above with much yellow to beige below. They are usually found in open woodland, reedbeds, or tall grass. The family occurs mostly in southern to western Eurasia and surroundings, but it also ranges far into the Pacific, with some species in Africa.

- Thick-billed warbler, Arundinax aedon (A)
- Black-browed reed warbler, Acrocephalus bistrigiceps
- Oriental reed warbler, Acrocephalus orientalis

== Grassbirds and allies ==
Order: Passeriformes Family: Locustellidae

Locustellidae are a family of small insectivorous songbirds found mainly in Eurasia, Africa, and the Australian region. They are smallish birds with tails that are usually long and pointed, and tend to be drab brownish or buffy all over.

- Gray's grasshopper warbler, Helopsaltes fasciolatus (A)
- Pallas's grasshopper warbler, Helopsaltes certhiola (A)
- Middendorff's grasshopper warbler, Helopsaltes ochotensis
- Pleske's grasshopper warbler, Helopsaltes pleskei (A)
- Lanceolated warbler, Locustella lanceolata (A)
- Baikal bush warbler, Locustella davidi (A)

== Swallows ==
Order: Passeriformes Family: Hirundinidae

The family Hirundinidae is adapted to aerial feeding. They have a slender streamlined body, long pointed wings and a short bill with a wide gape. The feet are adapted to perching rather than walking, and the front toes are partially joined at the base.

- Bank swallow, Riparia riparia (A)
- Barn swallow, Hirundo rustica
- Red-rumped swallow, Cecropis daurica
- Asian house-martin, Delichon dasypus (A)

== Bulbuls ==
Order: Passeriformes Family: Pycnonotidae

Bulbuls are medium-sized songbirds. Some are colourful with yellow, red or orange vents, cheeks, throats or supercilia, but most are drab, with uniform olive-brown to black plumage. Some species have distinct crests.

- Light-vented bulbul, Pycnonotus sinensis (A)
- Brown-eared bulbul, Hypsipetes amaurotis

== Leaf warblers ==
Order: Passeriformes Family: Phylloscopidae

Leaf warblers are a family of small insectivorous birds found mostly in Eurasia and ranging into Wallacea and Africa. The species are of various sizes, often green-plumaged above and yellow below, or more subdued with grayish-green to grayish-brown colors.

- Yellow-browed warbler, Phylloscopus inornatus
- Pallas's leaf warbler, Phylloscopus proregulus
- Radde's warbler, Phylloscopus schwarzi
- Dusky warbler, Phylloscopus fuscatus
- Common chiffchaff, Phylloscopus collybita (A)
- Eastern crowned warbler, Phylloscopus coronatus
- Two-barred warbler, Phylloscopus plumbeitarsus
- Pale-legged leaf warbler, Phylloscopus tenellipes
- Arctic warbler, Phylloscopus borealis

== Bush warblers and allies ==
Order: Passeriformes Family: Scotocercidae

The members of this family are found throughout Africa, Asia, and Polynesia. Their taxonomy is in flux, and some authorities place some genera in other families.

- Asian stubtail (땃새/숲새), Urosphena squameiceps
- Manchurian bush warbler (휘파람새), Horornis borealis

== Long-tailed tits ==
Order: Passeriformes Family: Aegithalidae

Long-tailed tits are a group of small passerine birds with medium to long tails. They make woven bag nests in trees. Most eat a mixed diet which includes insects.

- Long-tailed tit (오목눈이), Aegithalos caudatus

== Sylviid warblers, parrotbills, and allies ==
Order: Passeriformes Family: Sylviidae

The family Sylviidae is a group of small insectivorous passerine birds. They mainly occur as breeding species, as the common name implies, in Europe, Asia and, to a lesser extent, Africa. Most are of generally undistinguished appearance, but many have distinctive songs.

- Lesser whitethroat (쇠흰턱딱새), Curruca curruca (A)
- Beijing babbler (노래쟁이), Rhopophilus pekinensis (A)
- Vinous-throated parrotbill (부비새, 비비새, also known as 뱁새 (baepsae) in South Korea), Sinosuthora webbiana

== White-eyes, yuhinas, and Allies ==
Order: Passeriformes Family: Zosteropidae

The white-eyes are small and mostly undistinguished, their plumage above being generally some dull colour like greenish-olive, but some species have a white or bright yellow throat, breast or lower parts, and several have buff flanks. As their name suggests, many species have a white ring around each eye.

- Chestnut-flanked white-eye (북동박새), Zosterops erythropleurus

== Kinglets ==
Order: Passeriformes Family: Regulidae

The kinglets, also called crests, are a small group of birds often included in the Old World warblers, but frequently given family status because they also resemble the titmice.

- Goldcrest (금상모박새), Regulus regulus

== Nuthatches ==
Order: Passeriformes Family: Sittidae

Nuthatches are small woodland birds. They have the unusual ability to climb down trees head first, unlike other birds which can only go upwards. Nuthatches have big heads, short tails and powerful bills and feet.

- Eurasian nuthatch (동고비), Sitta europaea
- Snowy-browed nuthatch (작은동고비[쇠동고비]), Sitta villosa

== Treecreepers ==
Order: Passeriformes Family: Certhiidae

Treecreepers are small woodland birds, brown above and white below. They have thin pointed down-curved bills, which they use to extricate insects from bark. They have stiff tail feathers, like woodpeckers, which they use to support themselves on vertical trees.

- Eurasian treecreeper (나무발발이), Certhia familiaris (A)

== Wrens ==
Order: Passeriformes Family: Troglodytidae

The wrens are mainly small and inconspicuous except for their loud songs. These birds have short wings and thin down-turned bills. Several species often hold their tails upright. All are insectivorous.

- Eurasian wren (쥐새), Troglodytes troglodytes

== Dippers ==
Order: Passeriformes Family: Cinclidae

Dippers are a group of perching birds whose habitat includes aquatic environments in the Americas, Europe and Asia. They are named for their bobbing or dipping movements.

- Brown dipper (물쥐새), Cinclus pallasii

== Starlings ==
Order: Passeriformes Family: Sturnidae

Starlings are small to medium-sized passerine birds. Their flight is strong and direct and they are very gregarious. Their preferred habitat is fairly open country. They eat insects and fruit. Plumage is typically dark with a metallic sheen.

- European starling, Sturnus vulgaris (A)
- Daurian starling, Agropsar sturninus (A)
- Chestnut-cheeked starling, Agropsar philippensis (A)
- Red-billed starling, Spodiopsar sericeus (A)
- White-cheeked starling, Spodiopsar cineraceus

== Thrushes and allies ==
Order: Passeriformes Family: Turdidae

The thrushes are a group of passerine birds that occur mainly in the Old World. They are plump, soft plumaged, small to medium-sized insectivores or sometimes omnivores, often feeding on the ground. Many have attractive songs.

- White's thrush, Zoothera aurea
- Siberian thrush, Geokichla sibirica
- Japanese thrush, Turdus cardis (A)
- Gray-backed thrush, Turdus hortulorum
- Eyebrowed thrush, Turdus obscurus
- Brown-headed thrush, Turdus chrysolaus (A)
- Pale thrush, Turdus pallidus
- Red-throated thrush, Turdus ruficollis (A)
- Dusky thrush, Turdus eunomus
- Naumann's thrush, Turdus naumanni

== Old World flycatchers ==
Order: Passeriformes Family: Muscicapidae

Old World flycatchers are a large group of small passerine birds native to the Old World. They are mainly small arboreal insectivores. The appearance of these birds is highly varied, but they mostly have weak songs and harsh calls.

- Gray-streaked flycatcher, Muscicapa griseisticta
- Dark-sided flycatcher, Muscicapa sibirica
- Asian brown flycatcher, Muscicapa dauurica
- Blue-and-white flycatcher, Cyanoptila cyanomelana
- Rufous-tailed robin, Larvivora sibilans
- Japanese robin, Larvivora akahige (A)
- Siberian blue robin, Larvivora cyane
- Bluethroat, Luscinia svecica (A)
- Siberian rubythroat, Calliope calliope (A)
- Red-flanked bluetail, Tarsiger cyanurus
- Yellow-rumped flycatcher, Ficedula zanthopygia
- Green-backed flycatcher, Ficedula elisae (A)
- Narcissus flycatcher, Ficedula narcissina (A)
- Mugimaki flycatcher, Ficedula mugimaki
- Taiga flycatcher, Ficedula albicilla
- Black redstart, Phoenicurus ochruros (A)
- Daurian redstart, Phoenicurus auroreus
- White-throated rock-thrush, Monticola gularis
- Blue rock-thrush, Monticola solitarius
- Amur stonechat, Saxicola stejnegeri
- Pied wheatear, Oenanthe pleschanka (A)

== Waxwings ==
Order: Passeriformes Family: Bombycillidae

The waxwings are a group of birds with soft silky plumage and unique red tips to some of the wing feathers. In the Bohemian and cedar waxwings, these tips look like sealing wax and give the group its name. These are arboreal birds of northern forests. They live on insects in summer and berries in winter.

- Bohemian waxwing, Bombycilla garrulus
- Japanese waxwing, Bombycilla japonica (A)

== Accentors ==
Order: Passeriformes Family: Prunellidae

The accentors are in the only bird family, Prunellidae, which is completely endemic to the Palearctic. They are small, fairly drab species superficially similar to sparrows.

- Alpine accentor, Prunella collaris
- Siberian accentor, Prunella montanella

== Old World sparrows ==
Order: Passeriformes Family: Passeridae

Old World sparrows are small passerine birds. In general, sparrows tend to be small, plump, brown or grey birds with short tails and short powerful beaks. Sparrows are seed eaters, but they also consume small insects.

- Russet sparrow (섬참새), Passer cinnamomeus (A)
- Eurasian tree sparrow, Passer montanus

== Wagtails and pipits ==
Order: Passeriformes Family: Motacillidae

Motacillidae is a family of small passerine birds with medium to long tails. They include the wagtails, longclaws and pipits. They are slender, ground feeding insectivores of open country.

- Forest wagtail, Dendronanthus indicus
- Gray wagtail, Motacilla cinerea
- Eastern yellow wagtail, Motacilla tschutschensis
- Japanese wagtail, Motacilla grandis (A)
- White wagtail, Motacilla alba
- Richard's pipit, Anthus richardi (A)
- Blyth's pipit, Anthus godlewskii (A)
- Olive-backed pipit (숲종다리[숲종달이]), Anthus hodgsoni (A)
- Pechora pipit (흰등논종다리[흰등논종달이]), Anthus gustavi (A)
- Red-throated pipit (붉은가슴논종다리[붉은가슴논종달이]), Anthus cervinus
- American pipit (산논종다리[씨비리논종다리, 씨비리논종달이]), Anthus rubescens (A)

== Finches, euphonias, and allies ==
Order: Passeriformes Family: Fringillidae

Finches are seed-eating passerine birds, that are small to moderately large and have a strong beak, usually conical and in some species very large. All have twelve tail feathers and nine primaries. These birds have a bouncing flight with alternating bouts of flapping and gliding on closed wings, and most sing well.

- Brambling, Fringilla montifringilla
- Hawfinch, Coccothraustes coccothraustes
- Yellow-billed grosbeak, Eophona migratoria
- Japanese grosbeak, Eophona personata
- Common rosefinch, Carpodacus erythrinus
- Long-tailed rosefinch, Carpodacus sibiricus
- Pallas's rosefinch, Carpodacus roseus
- Pine grosbeak, Pinicola enucleator (A)
- Eurasian bullfinch, Pyrrhula pyrrhula
- Asian rosy-finch, Leucosticte arctoa
- Oriental greenfinch, Chloris sinica
- Hoary redpoll, Acanthis hornemanni
- Red crossbill, Loxia curvirostra
- Eurasian siskin, Spinus spinus

== Longspurs and arctic buntings ==
Order: Passeriformes Family: Calcariidae

The Calcariidae are a group of passerine birds which had been traditionally grouped with the New World sparrows, but differ in a number of respects and are usually found in open grassy areas.

- Lapland longspur (긴발톱멧새[긴발톱메'새]), Calcarius lapponicus (A)

== Old World buntings ==
Order: Passeriformes Family: Emberizidae

The emberizids are a large family of passerine birds. They are seed-eating birds with distinctively shaped bills. Many emberizid species have distinctive head patterns.

- Chestnut-eared bunting (붉은뺨멧새[붉은뺨메'새]), Emberiza fucata
- Rufous-backed bunting (함북메새), Emberiza jankowskii (Ex)
- Meadow bunting, Emberiza cioides
- Pine bunting, Emberiza leucocephalos (A)
- Yellow-throated bunting, Emberiza elegans
- Ochre-rumped bunting, Emberiza yessoensis (A)
- Pallas's bunting, Emberiza pallasi
- Reed bunting, Emberiza schoeniclus
- Yellow-breasted bunting, Emberiza aureola
- Little bunting, Emberiza pusilla (A)
- Rustic bunting (뿔메새), Emberiza rustica
- Yellow bunting, Emberiza sulphurata (A)
- Black-faced bunting, Emberiza spodocephala
- Chestnut bunting (밤등메새), Emberiza rutila
- Yellow-browed bunting (노랑눈섭멧새[노랑눈'섭메'새]), Emberiza chrysophrys (A)
- Tristram's bunting (흰배멧새), Emberiza tristrami

== See also ==
- List of birds
- Lists of birds by region
