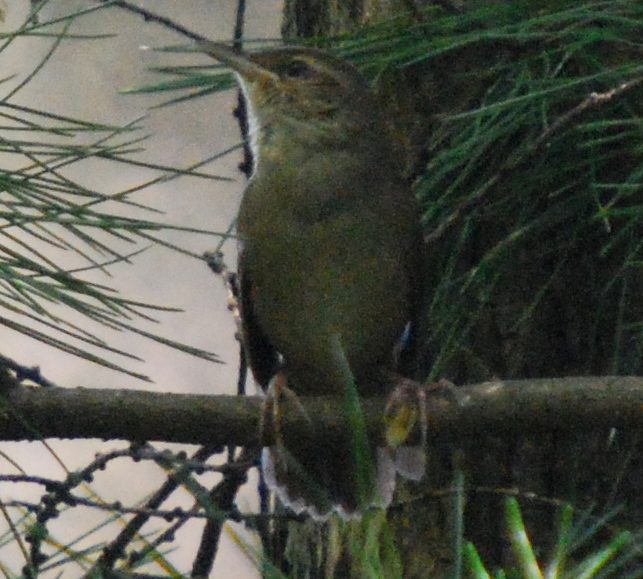
- from Hokkaido, Japan

Conservation status
- Least Concern (IUCN 3.1)

Scientific classification
- Kingdom: Animalia
- Phylum: Chordata
- Class: Aves
- Order: Passeriformes
- Family: Locustellidae
- Genus: Helopsaltes
- Species: H. amnicola

Binomial name
- Helopsaltes amnicola (Stepanyan, 1972)

Synonyms
- Locustella amnicola

= Sakhalin grasshopper warbler =

Species of bird

Sakhalin grasshopper warbler (Helopsaltes amnicola), is a species of bird in the family Locustellidae; it was formerly included in the "Old World warbler" assemblage.

== Distribution and habitat ==
This small passerine bird breeds on Sakhalin, the southern Kuril Islands and Hokkaido. It is a species found in lowland and coastal regions, nesting in forests or thickets.

== Description ==
The adult has an unstreaked olive-brown back, uniformly grey breast and buff underparts, with unmottled dull orange undertail coverts.

The song is a short phrase, loud and distinctive; nothing like the insect-like reeling of European Locustella species, and more musical than that of Pallas's grasshopper warbler.
