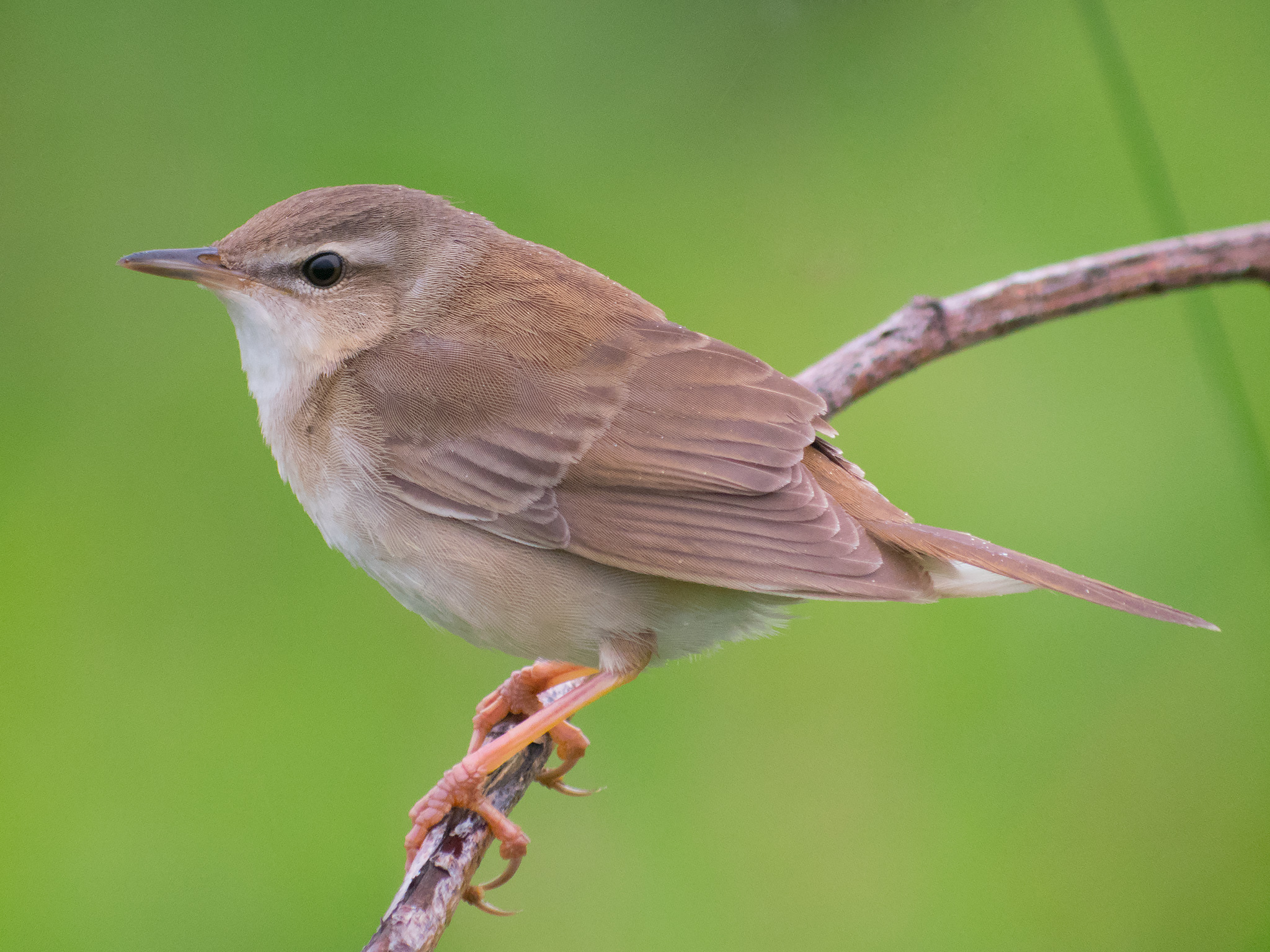
- Middendorff's grasshopper warbler (Helopsaltes ochotensis)

Scientific classification
- Kingdom: Animalia
- Phylum: Chordata
- Class: Aves
- Order: Passeriformes
- Family: Locustellidae
- Genus: Helopsaltes; Alström, Cibois, Irestedt, Zuccon, Gelang, Fjeldså, Andersen, Moyle, Pasquet & Olsson, 2018

Type species
- Motacilla certhiola Pallas, 1811

= Helopsaltes =

Genus of birds

Helopsaltes is a genus of passerine birds in the grassbird family Locustellidae.

A comprehensive molecular phylogenetic study of the grassbird family Locustellidae published in 2018 found that the genus Locustella consisted of two distinct clades. The genus was split and six species were moved to the newly described genus Helopsaltes with Pallas's grasshopper warbler (Helopsaltes certhiola) as the type species. The genus name combines the Ancient Greek ἕλος/helos meaning "marshy ground" and ψάλτης/psaltis "a chanter".

As well as the genetic separation, the species of Helopsaltes also differ markedly from Locustella in song structure, with varied, 'flowing' warbling songs as opposed to the repetitive and often metronomic insect- (particularly grasshopper)-like songs of Locustella species. They are very similar to Locustella species in their cryptic camouflaged plumage, with no differing genus-wide characters; they also show a similar range of size (12–18 cm) to Locustella.

The genus contains the following six species:

Image	Common name	Scientific name	Distribution
	Sakhalin grasshopper warbler	Helopsaltes amnicola	Breeds on Sakhalin, the southern Kuril Islands, and Hokkaido.
	Gray's grasshopper warbler	Helopsaltes fasciolatus	Breeds in southern Siberia, northeastern China, and Korea; winters in southeast Asia.
	Marsh grassbird	Helopsaltes pryeri	China, Japan, South Korea, Mongolia, and Russia.
	Pallas's grasshopper warbler	Helopsaltes certhiola	Breeds in the eastern Palearctic from the Altai Mountains, Mongolia, and Transbaikalia to northeastern China; winters from India east to Indonesia, rare migrant in Sri Lanka.
	Styan's grasshopper warbler	Helopsaltes pleskei	Breeds in eastern Siberia to Korea, Kyushu, and the Izu Islands; wintering in South China.
	Middendorff's grasshopper warbler	Helopsaltes ochotensis	Breeds in eastern Siberia to northern Japan, the Kamchatka Peninsula, and the northern Kuril Islands.
