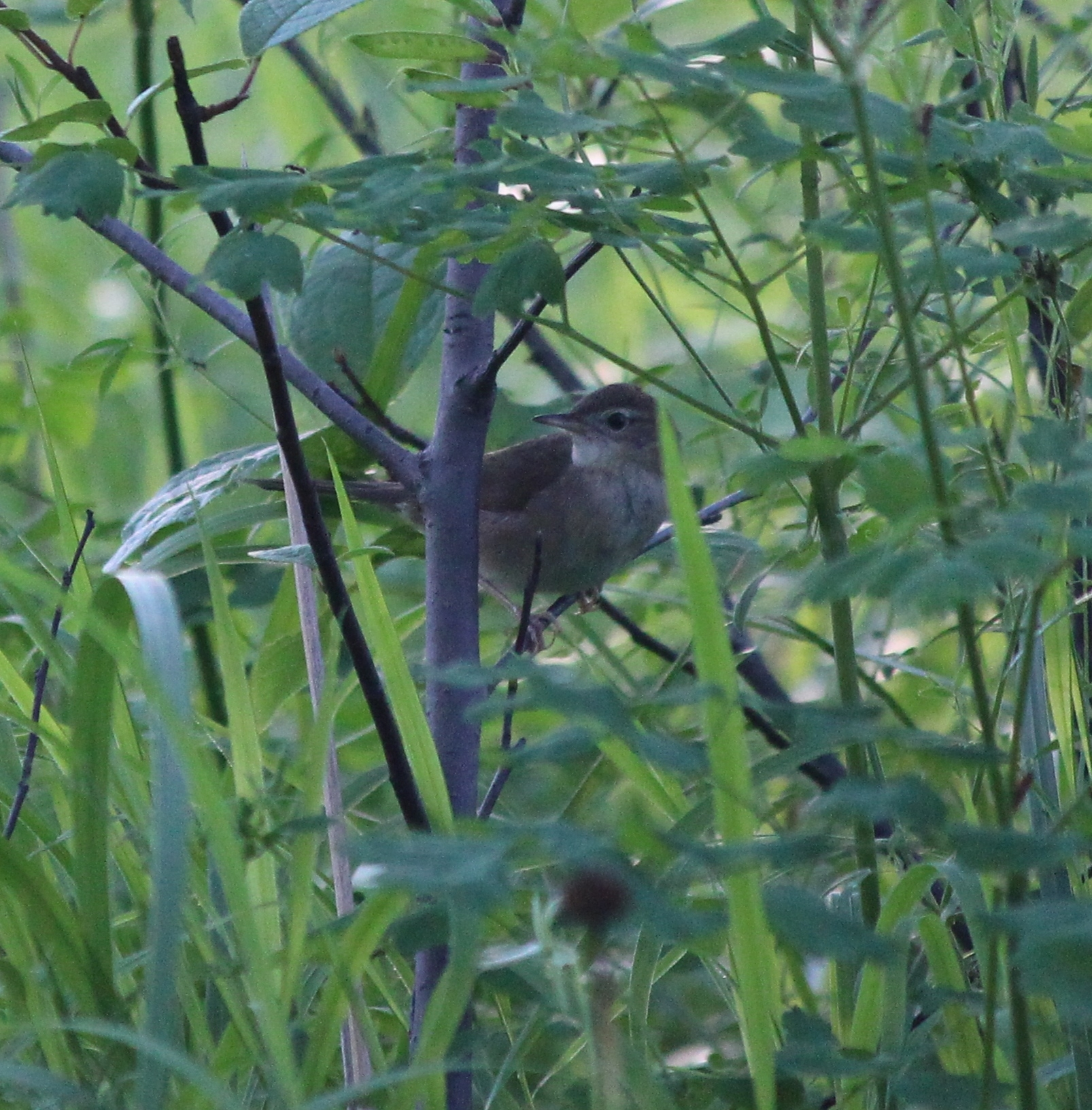

Conservation status
- Least Concern (IUCN 3.1)

Scientific classification
- Kingdom: Animalia
- Phylum: Chordata
- Class: Aves
- Order: Passeriformes
- Family: Locustellidae
- Genus: Helopsaltes
- Species: H. fasciolatus

Binomial name
- Helopsaltes fasciolatus (G. R. Gray, 1861)

Synonyms
- Locustella fasciolata

= Gray's grasshopper warbler =

Species of bird

Gray's grasshopper warbler (Helopsaltes fasciolatus), also known as Gray's warbler, is a species of bird in the family Locustellidae; it was formerly included in the "Old World warbler" assemblage.

The Sakhalin grasshopper warbler was formerly considered conspecific.

== Distribution and habitat ==
This small passerine bird breeds in southern Siberia, northeastern China and Korea. It is migratory, wintering in southeast Asia. It is a species found in lowland and coastal regions, nesting in forests or thickets.

== Description ==
The adult has an unstreaked olive-brown back, uniformly grey breast and buff underparts, with unmottled dull orange undertail coverts.

The song is a short phrase, loud and distinctive; nothing like the insect-like reeling of European Locustella species, and more musical than that of Pallas's grasshopper warbler.
