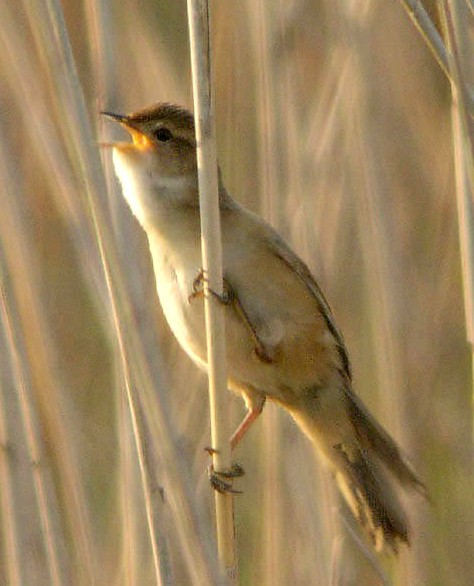

Conservation status
- Least Concern (IUCN 3.1)

Scientific classification
- Kingdom: Animalia
- Phylum: Chordata
- Class: Aves
- Order: Passeriformes
- Family: Locustellidae
- Genus: Helopsaltes
- Species: H. pryeri

Binomial name
- Helopsaltes pryeri (Seebohm, 1884)

Synonyms
- Megalurus pryeri Locustella pryeri

= Marsh grassbird =

Species of bird

The marsh grassbird (Helopsaltes pryeri), also known as the Japanese swamp warbler, is a species of Old World warbler in the family Locustellidae. It is found in China, Japan, South Korea, Mongolia, and Russia.

Its natural habitat is swamps. It is threatened by habitat loss.
