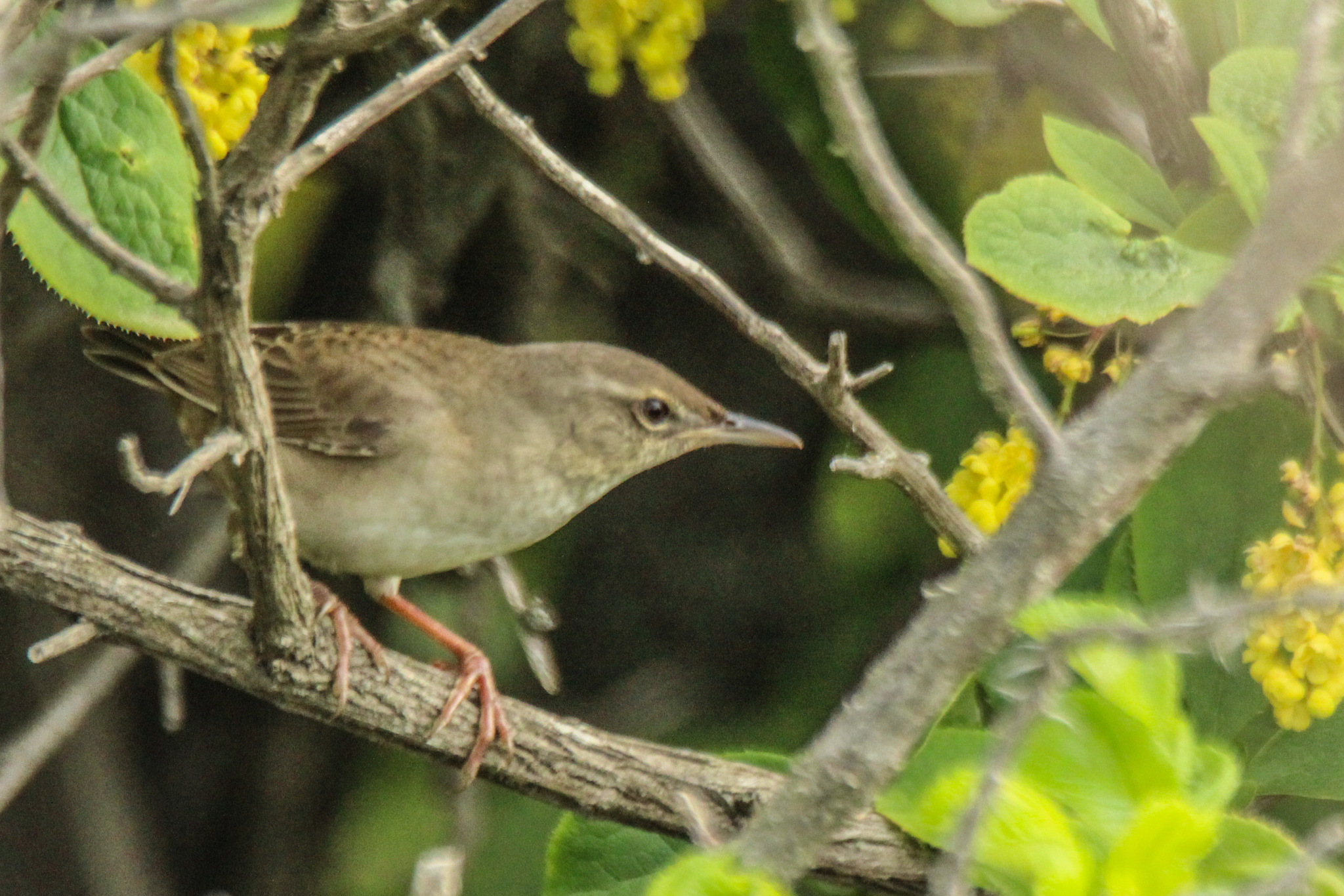

Conservation status
- Vulnerable (IUCN 3.1)

Scientific classification
- Kingdom: Animalia
- Phylum: Chordata
- Class: Aves
- Order: Passeriformes
- Family: Locustellidae
- Genus: Helopsaltes
- Species: H. pleskei

Binomial name
- Helopsaltes pleskei (Taczanowski, 1890)

Synonyms
- Locustella pleskei

= Styan's grasshopper warbler =

Species of bird

Styan's grasshopper warbler (Helopsaltes pleskei), also known as Pleske's grasshopper warbler and Taczanowski's warbler, is a species of Old World warbler in the family Locustellidae. It breeds in eastern Siberia to Korea, Kyushu and Izu Islands; wintering in South China. Its natural habitats are temperate shrubland, subtropical or tropical dry shrubland, and swamps. It is threatened by habitat loss. Its name recognises the naturalist and collector, Frederick William Styan.
