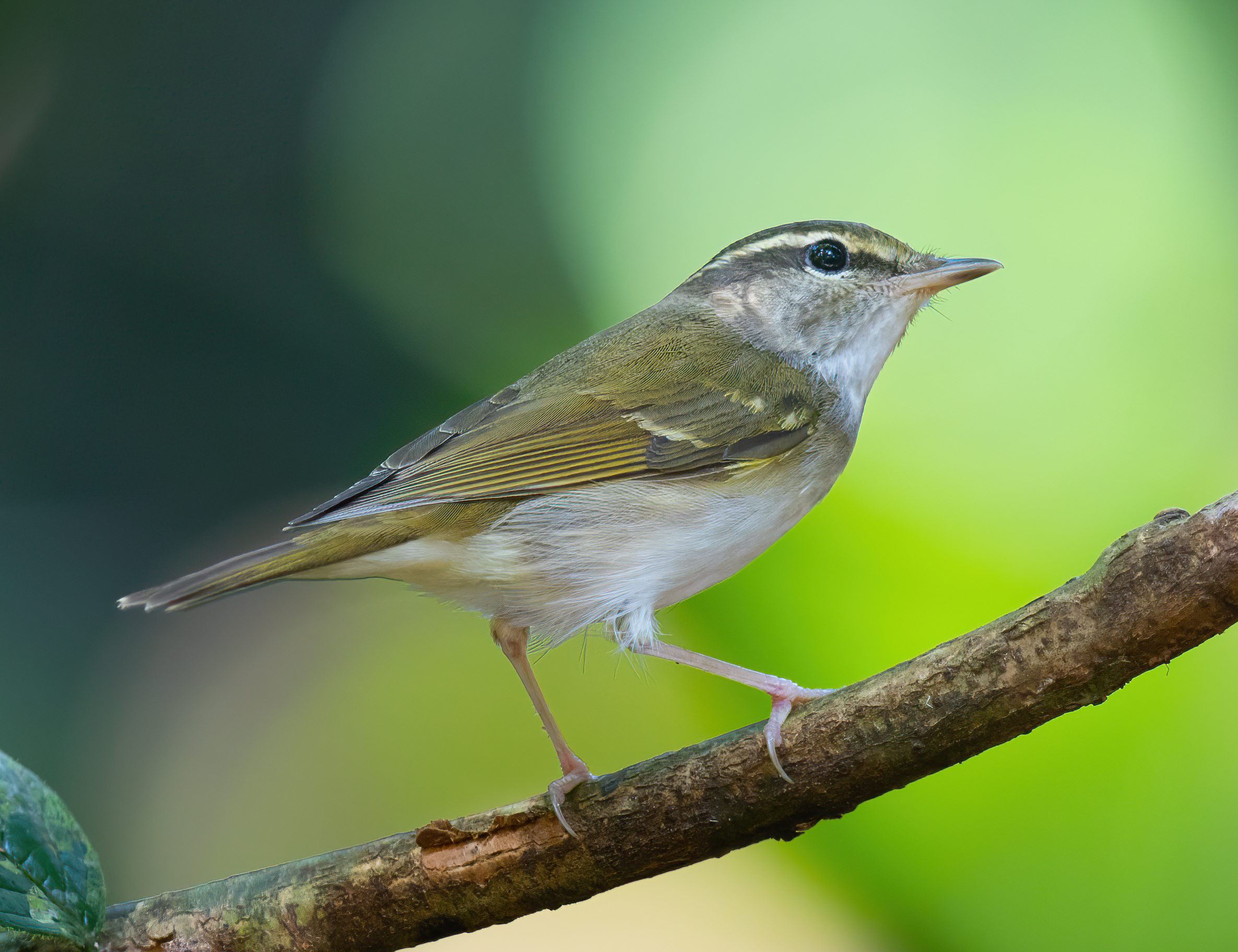

Conservation status
- Least Concern (IUCN 3.1)

Scientific classification
- Kingdom: Animalia
- Phylum: Chordata
- Class: Aves
- Order: Passeriformes
- Family: Phylloscopidae
- Genus: Phylloscopus
- Species: P. tenellipes

Binomial name
- Phylloscopus tenellipes R. Swinhoe, 1860

= Pale-legged leaf warbler =

Species of bird

The pale-legged leaf warbler (Phylloscopus tenellipes) is a species of Old World warbler in the family Phylloscopidae. The species was first described by Robert Swinhoe in 1860. It is found in Manchuria; it winters in Southeast Asia. Its natural habitat is temperate forests.

== Description ==
It is 12 cm in length with brownish upperparts and a contrasting greyish-brown crown and nape. The whitish supercilium contrasts strongly, not reaching the forehead but extending well behind the eyes. Its eyeline is dark brown and wider behind the eye. Cheeks mottled pale brown and throat whitish. White undertail coverts contrast with paler olive-brown rump and uppertail coverts, lacks greenish tinge. Breast and belly whitish, washed pale brown.

== Voice ==
Song, tiriririririririri repeating.
