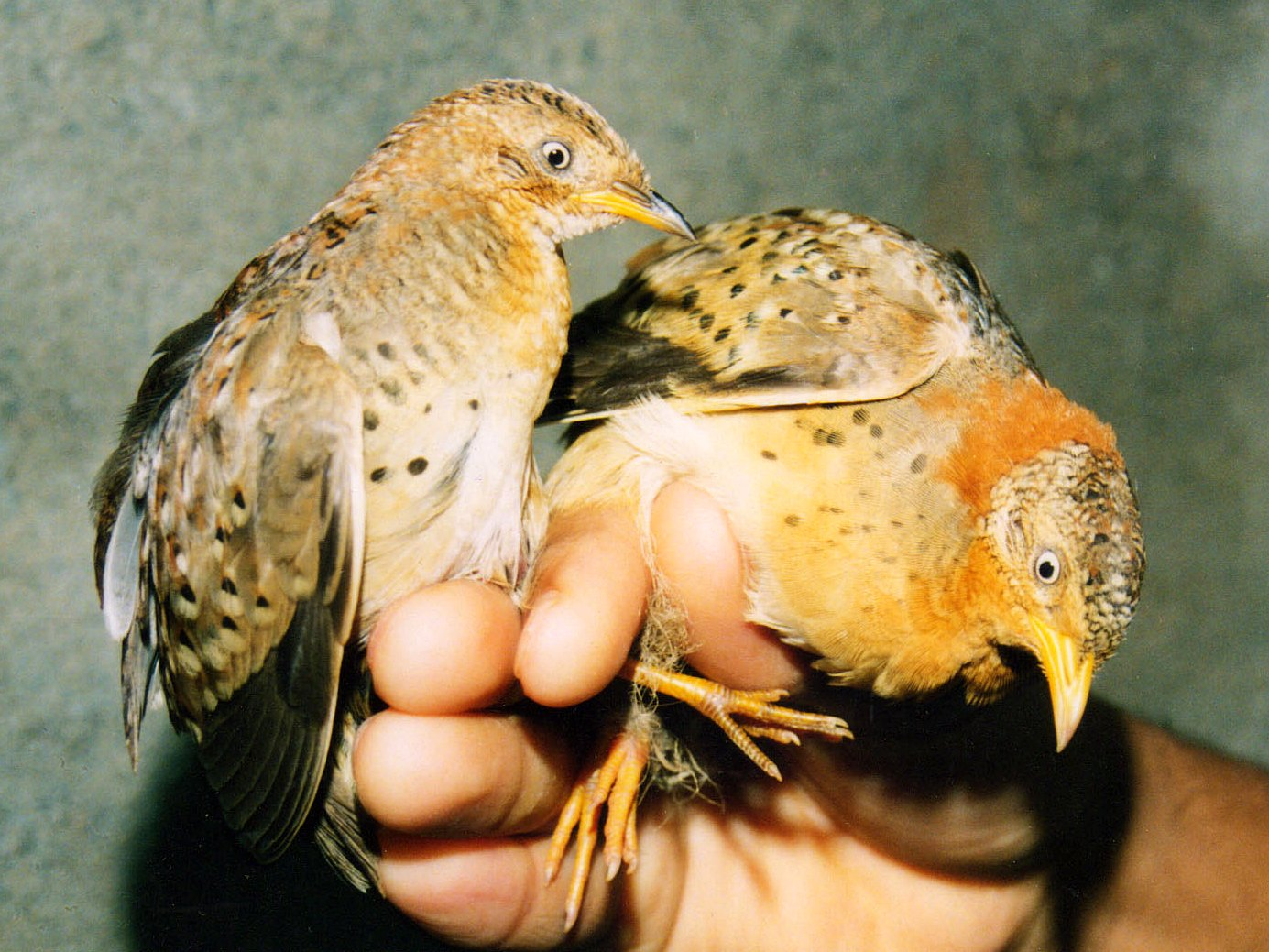
- Yellow-legged buttonquails. Maharashtra, India

Conservation status
- Least Concern (IUCN 3.1)

Scientific classification
- Kingdom: Animalia
- Phylum: Chordata
- Class: Aves
- Order: Charadriiformes
- Family: Turnicidae
- Genus: Turnix
- Species: T. tanki

Binomial name
- Turnix tanki Blyth, 1843

= Yellow-legged buttonquail =

Species of bird

The yellow-legged buttonquail (Turnix tanki) is a buttonquail, one of a small family of birds which resemble, but are unrelated to, the true quails. This family is peculiar in that the females are larger and more colourful than the males and are polyandrous.

== Description ==
The yellow-legged buttonquail is a small quail growing to a length of 15 to 18 cm (6 to 7 in), the females being slightly larger and more brightly coloured than the males. The weight is 36 to 43 g (1.3 to 1.5 oz) for the subspecies Turnix tanki tanki, and 35 to 78 g (1.2 to 2.8 oz) for the male T. t. blanfordii, while the female of this subspecies is 93 to 113 g (3.3 to 4.0 oz). The tail is short and the wings have rounded ends.

The adult male has a black crown with a buff margin, and sometimes a buff central streak. The front and side of the head are buff, the individual feathers having black tips. The throat is pale buff, darkening to reddish-buff at the edges and on the breast, and paling again on the belly, becoming white at the under tail coverts. The sides of the breast are scattered with round black spots. The nape and upper parts of the body and tail are greyish-brown, with reddish and dark brown vermiculations and spotting. The main wing feathers are blackish-brown with buff margins, and the wing coverts are buff with dark spots. The beak is dull yellow, the irises whitish, and the legs and feet deep yellow.

The adult female differs from the male in being a richer colour and in having a broad, reddish-brown collar round the back of the neck. The spots and vermiculations on the back and tail are not so dark, the beak and legs are brighter yellow, and the irises are creamy white or yellowish-brown. In non-breeding plumage, the rufous collar of the female becomes mixed with grey and the other plumage also become greyer. The juvenile is similar to the male in appearance but has dingier plumage, a less vivid breast colour and more fine speckling.

== Distribution and habitat ==
The species is endemic to the Indian subcontinent, East Asia and Southeast Asia. There are two recognised subspecies; T. t. tanki is found in Pakistan, India and Nepal, and the Andaman and Nicobar Islands; and T. t. blanfordii is found in Myanmar, and Indochina, and eastwards to eastern China. It also migrates to and breeds in the Korea peninsular and the southernmost parts of southeast Russia. In most of its range it is a resident species, but it migrates to the drier parts of India in the wet season, and similarly to the southeastern part of Russia, making its journeys by night.

== Behaviour ==
This species is ground-dwelling and usually runs away from danger rather than taking to the air. It is generally seen singly or in pairs.

=== Feeding ===
The diet includes green plant material, seeds, and a variety of insects including beetles, ants and grasshoppers.

=== Breeding ===
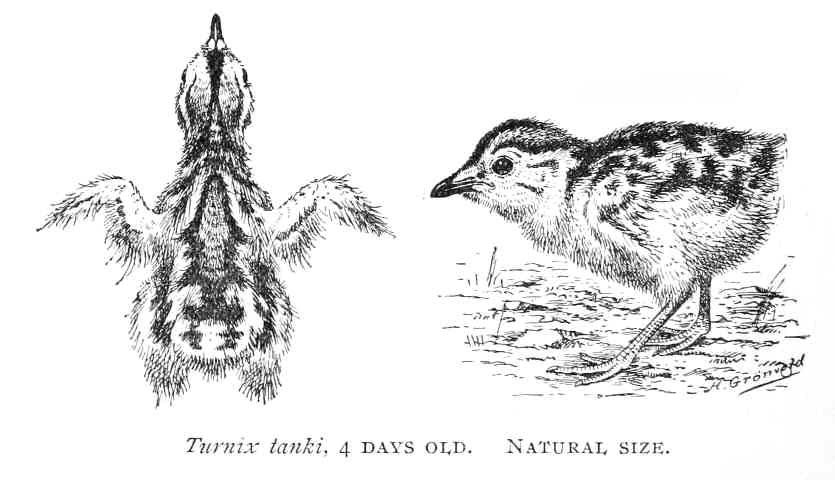
Downy four-day-old chicks

Breeding takes place between March and November, mostly in the wet season. Females have a bright rufous nape collar which is moulted during the non-breeding season. Females offer food to males during courtship and once the eggs are laid, the females leave incubation to the male. The eggs hatch after about 12 days (in captivity) and the chicks follow the male after hatching. The nest is a scoop in the ground lined with grasses and often roofed with bent-down plant stems, having an entrance at the side. A clutch of four greyish-white, blotched eggs is laid and these are incubated by the male alone; they hatch after twelve to sixteen days and the chicks are cared for by the male. After her eggs are laid, the female moves off and selects another mate, with whom she lays another clutch of eggs in a different nest.

== Conservation ==
T. tanki has a very wide range and is a relatively common species. The total number of birds is thought to be stable, and no particular threats to this species have been detected. The International Union for Conservation of Nature has assessed the bird's conservation status as being of "least concern".
