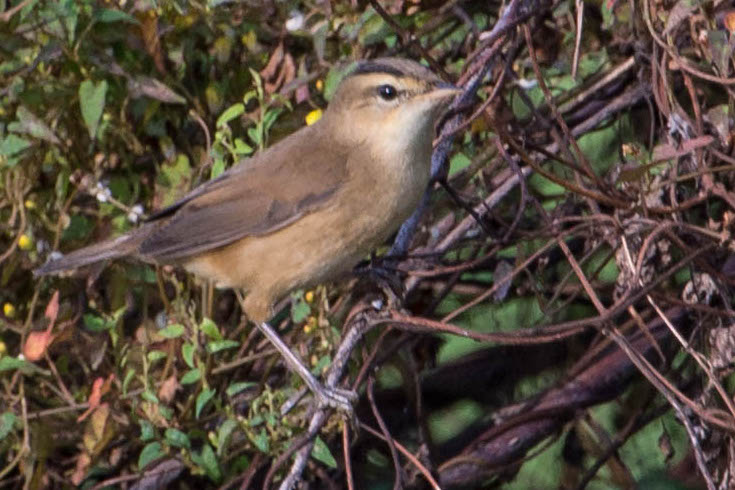
- In Bueng Boraphet, central Thailand

Conservation status
- Least Concern (IUCN 3.1)

Scientific classification
- Kingdom: Animalia
- Phylum: Chordata
- Class: Aves
- Order: Passeriformes
- Family: Acrocephalidae
- Genus: Acrocephalus
- Species: A. bistrigiceps

Binomial name
- Acrocephalus bistrigiceps R. Swinhoe, 1860
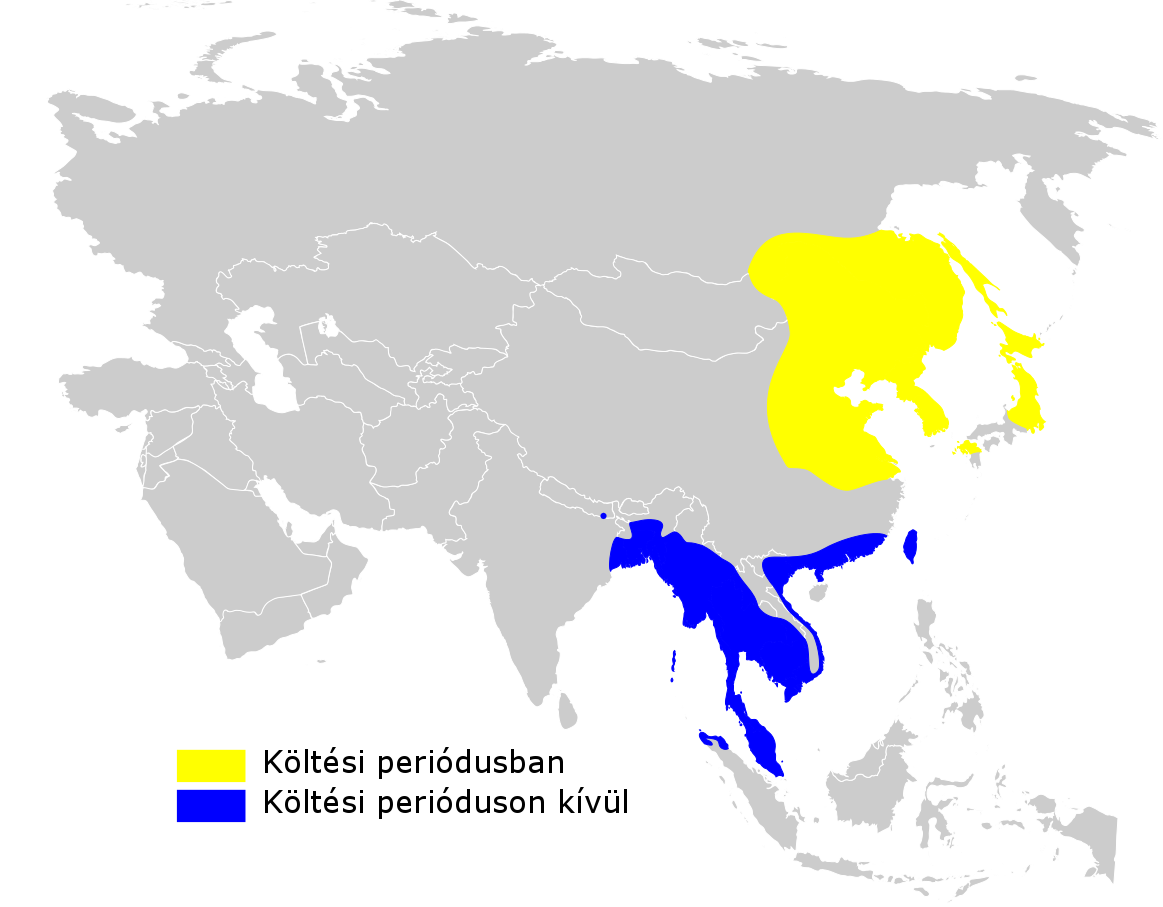
- Distribution of Black-browed Reed Warbler Breeding Non-breeding

Synonyms
- Salicaria maackii Schrenck, 1860

= Black-browed reed warbler =

Species of bird

The black-browed reed warbler (Acrocephalus bistrigiceps) is a marsh-warbler in the family Acrocephalidae. It was formerly included in the "Old World warbler" assemblage. The species was first described by Robert Swinhoe in 1860.

It breeds from eastern Mongolia and south-eastern Russia to eastern China and Japan, and winters in Southeast Asia.

The black-browed reed warbler is similar and closely related to the more common and widespread Eurasian reed warbler. The bird spends its time foraging close to the ground inside undisturbed reed beds. Like many other wetland birds, it is of conservation concern owing to habitat loss due to the destruction of native marsh vegetation and its replacement by rice paddies and fishponds.
