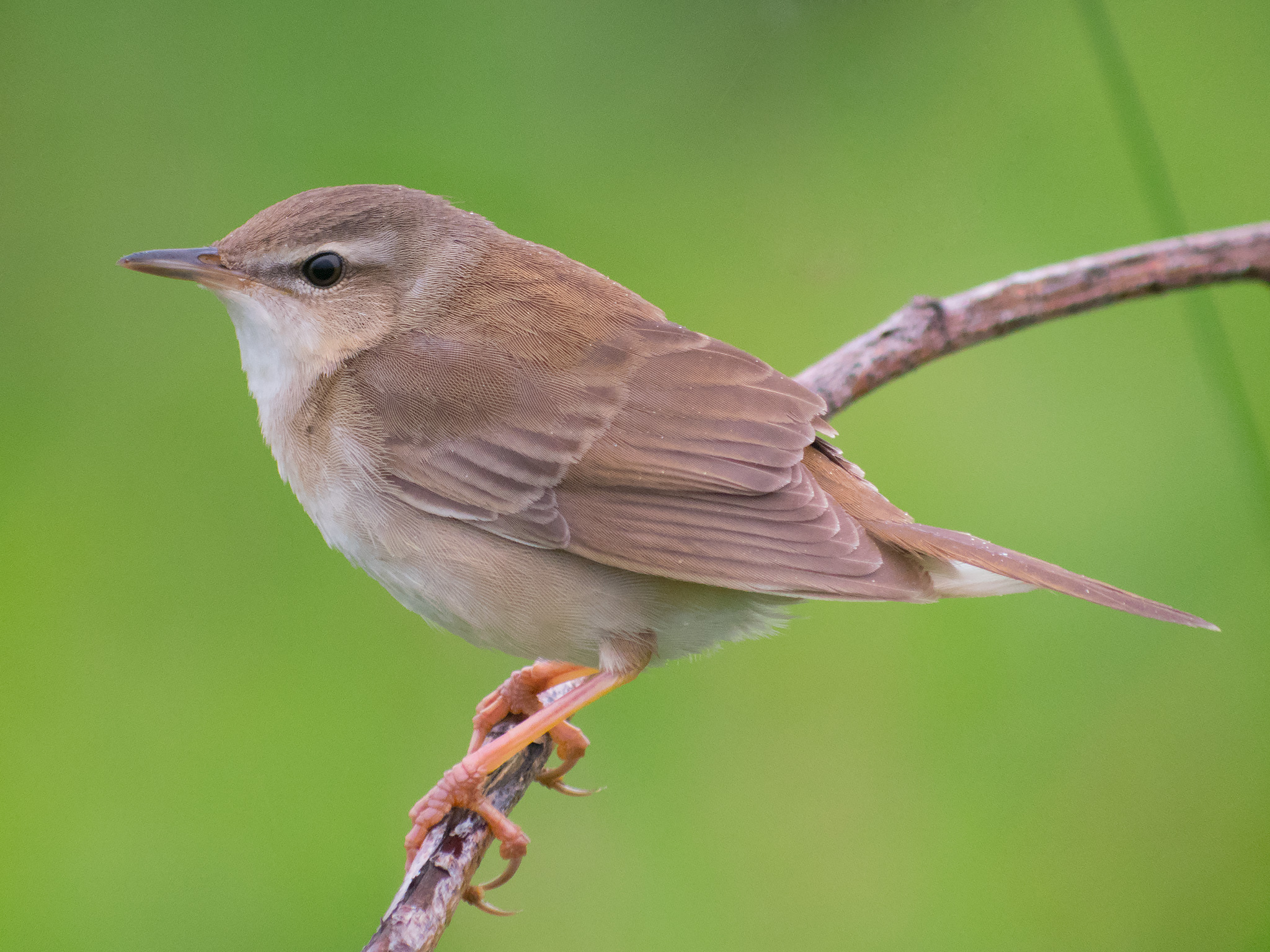
- In Hokkaido, Japan

Conservation status
- Least Concern (IUCN 3.1)

Scientific classification
- Kingdom: Animalia
- Phylum: Chordata
- Class: Aves
- Order: Passeriformes
- Family: Locustellidae
- Genus: Helopsaltes
- Species: H. ochotensis

Binomial name
- Helopsaltes ochotensis (Middendorff, 1853)
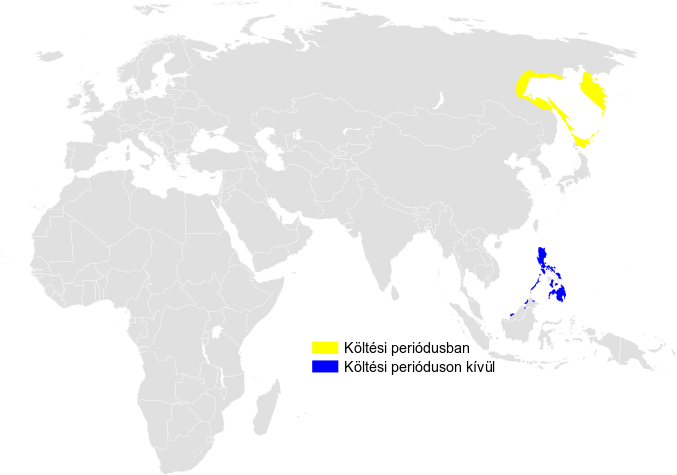
- Distribution of Middendorff's grasshopper warbler Breeding Non-breeding

Synonyms
- Locustella ochotensis

= Middendorff's grasshopper warbler =

Species of bird

Middendorff's grasshopper warbler (Helopsaltes ochotensis) is a species of Old World warbler in the family Locustellidae. It breeds in eastern Siberia to northern Japan, Kamchatka Peninsula and northern Kuril Islands. It winters in the Philippines, Borneo and Sulawesi and in small numbers in China, Hong Kong, South Korea, Malaysia, Taiwan and the U.S.A.

The common name commemorates Alexander Theodor von Middendorff (1815–1894), a German–Russian naturalist who traveled extensively in Siberia.

== Description ==
Middendorff's grasshopper warbler is 15.5 cm (6.1 in) in length. The crown, nape, lores and eye-stripe are greyish brown. The mantle is browner and more olive. The supercilium is pale creamy, extending to the ear coverts. The rump and uppertail coverts are more yellowish or rufous brown. The graduated, white-tipped tail may appear rounded. Its song is a high-pitched, spaced chit, chit, which precedes a trilled trrrrrrrr-schoy-schoy-schoy, call; tluk, tluk,...; it also performs a short song flight. Its habitat is forests near water and scrubwoods.
