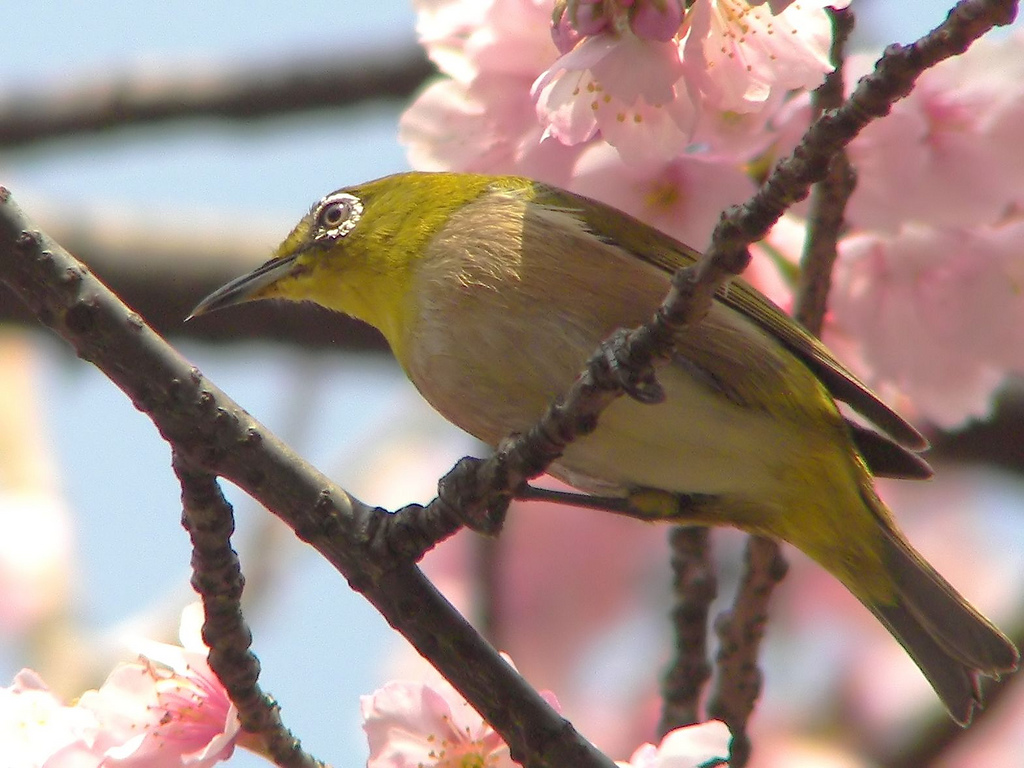

Conservation status
- Least Concern (IUCN 3.1)

Scientific classification
- Kingdom: Animalia
- Phylum: Chordata
- Class: Aves
- Order: Passeriformes
- Family: Zosteropidae
- Genus: Zosterops
- Species: Z. erythropleurus

Binomial name
- Zosterops erythropleurus R. Swinhoe, 1863

= Chestnut-flanked white-eye =

Species of bird

The chestnut-flanked white-eye (Zosterops erythropleurus) is a bird in the family Zosteropidae. The species was first described by Robert Swinhoe in 1863. It is found in forests, and prefers rather deep mixed and coniferous forests.

== Description ==
It is 10.5 cm in length and has a distinct chestnut patch on its flanks. The bill base and lower mandible may be pinkish. Its underparts are whiter. The similar Japanese white-eye is pale brown on its flanks.

== Distribution and habitat ==
It is migratory, breeding in Manchuria and migrating to central China, the province of Yunnan and northern Southeast Asia in the winter. It is the most migratory species of white-eye. It breeds in poplar, alder and willow forests, thickets and groves, and winters in deciduous and evergreen forests, usually above 1000 m.
