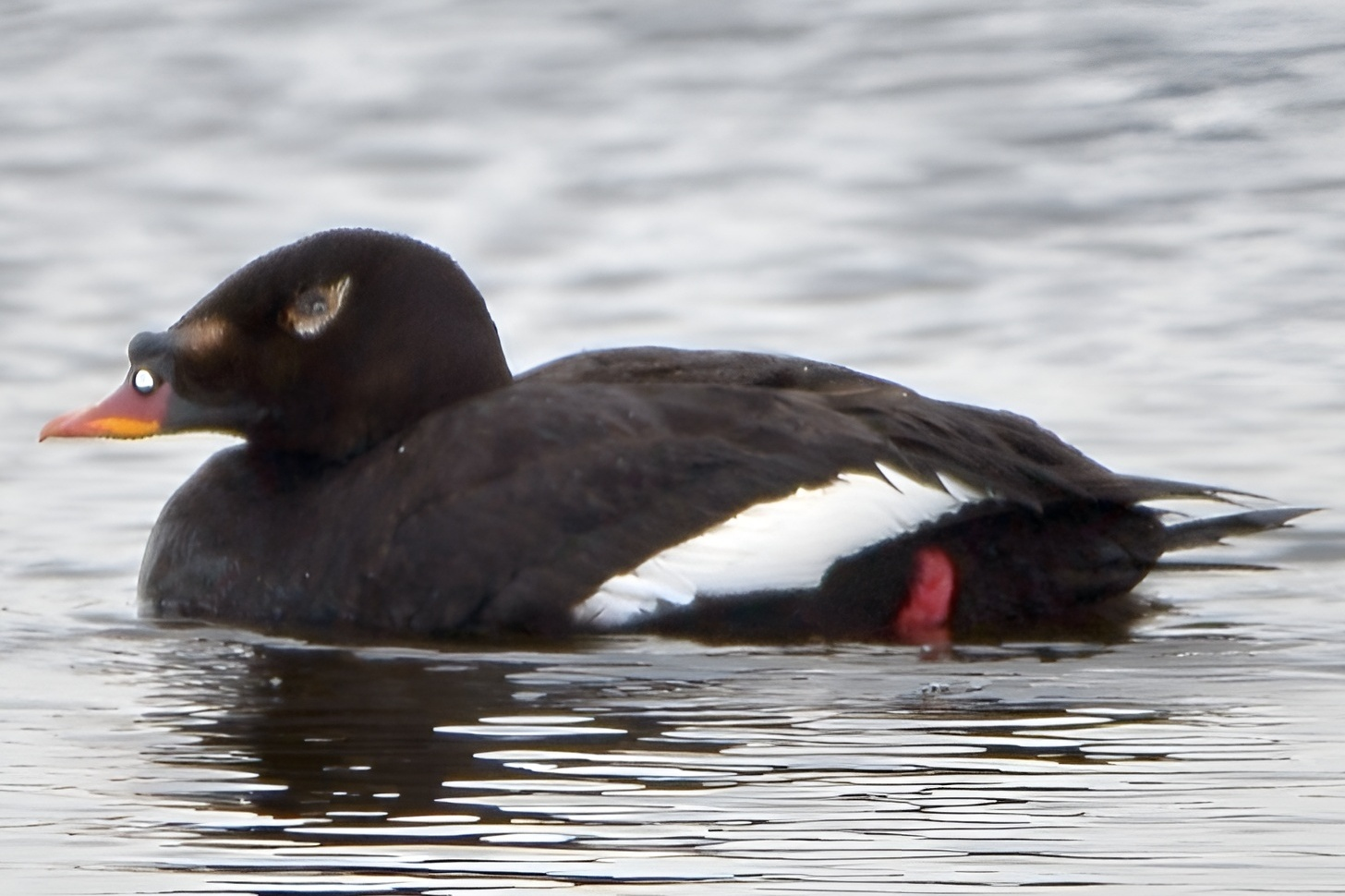

Conservation status
- Least Concern (IUCN 3.1)

Scientific classification
- Kingdom: Animalia
- Phylum: Chordata
- Class: Aves
- Order: Anseriformes
- Family: Anatidae
- Genus: Melanitta
- Species: M. stejnegeri

Binomial name
- Melanitta stejnegeri (Ridgway, 1887)

= Stejneger's scoter =

Species of bird

Stejneger's scoter (Melanitta stejnegeri), also known as the Siberian scoter, is a large sea duck. The genus name is derived from Ancient Greek melas "black" and netta "duck".

== Taxonomy ==
Stejneger's scoter was described by the American ornithologist Robert Ridgway in 1887 and given the binomial name Oidemia stejnegeri. The specific name was chosen to honour the Norwegian born ornithologist Leonhard Stejneger.

It was formerly considered to be conspecific with the white-winged scoter. It was suggested to be a full species, according to a new study, and the species were split in 2019.

== Description ==
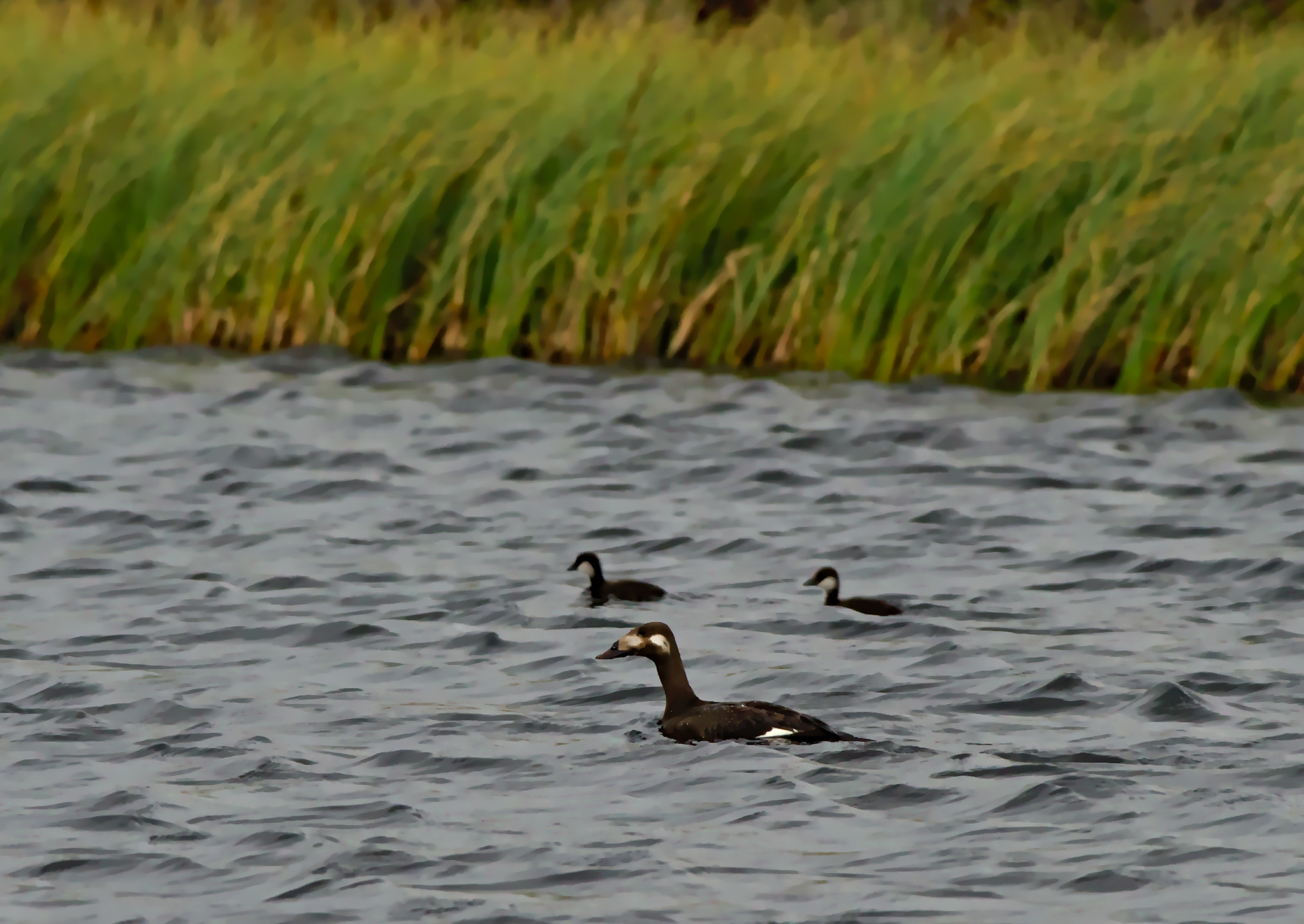
Female with young in Tuva, Russia

There are a number of differing characteristics of Stejneger's scoter and the white-winged scoter. Males of the white-winged scoter have browner flanks, dark yellow coloration of most of the bill and a less tall bill knob, approaching the velvet scoter. The male Stejneger's scoter has a very tall knob at the base of its mostly orange-yellow bill. The males of both species are very similar and best distinguished by head shape; White-winged scoters tend to have "two-stepped" profile between the bill and the head, compared to the long "Roman nose" profile of Stejneger's scoter similar to that of a common eider. Additionally, the feathering along the base of the upper mandible forms a right angle on the white-winged scoter, compared to the acute angle on the Stejneger's scoter.

== Distribution ==
Stejneger's scoter breeds over the far north of Asia east of the Yenisey Basin. It winters further south in temperate zones, in Asia as far south as China. It forms large flocks on suitable coastal waters. These are tightly packed, and the birds tend to take off together.

Though previously considered rare in North America, Stejneger's scoter may be a regular visitor and possible breeder in Western Alaska, with sightings in Nome, Saint Paul Island and Gambell. A Stejneger's scoter was seen in Helena Valley, Montana, between April and May 2015, the only confirmed North American occurrence of the species south of Alaska. A scoter seen in Monterey Bay, California, on January 15, 2014, appeared to have characteristics consistent with Stejneger's scoter but the record was not accepted by the committee due to the poor quality of images. Stejneger's scoter is also a rare vagrant to Europe and has been recorded from France, Finland, Poland, Iceland, Ireland, Norway, Scotland and Sweden.

== Behaviour and ecology ==
=== Feeding ===
In freshwater, this species primarily feeds on crustaceans and insects; while in saltwater areas, it feeds on molluscs and crustaceans.
