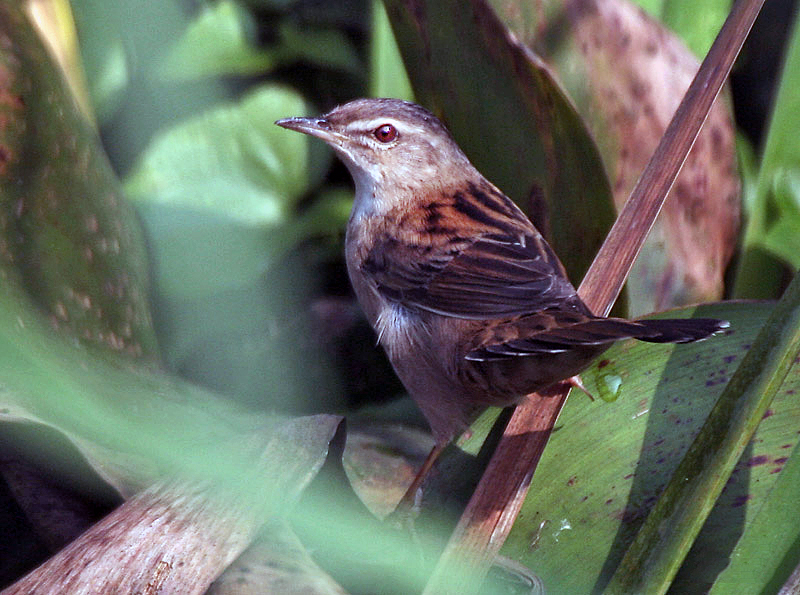
- In Kolkata, West Bengal, India.

Conservation status
- Least Concern (IUCN 3.1)

Scientific classification
- Kingdom: Animalia
- Phylum: Chordata
- Class: Aves
- Order: Passeriformes
- Family: Locustellidae
- Genus: Helopsaltes
- Species: H. certhiola

Binomial name
- Helopsaltes certhiola (Pallas, 1811)
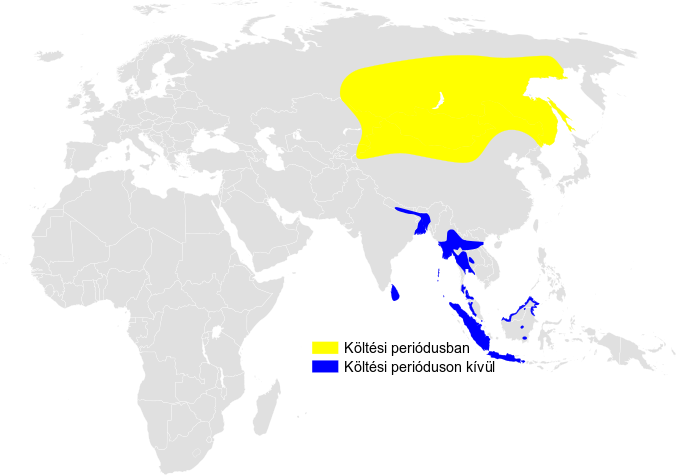
- Range of Helopsaltes certhiola Breeding Non-breeding

Synonyms
- Locustella certhiola (Pallas, 1811); Motacilla certhiola Pallas, 1811

= Pallas's grasshopper warbler =

Species of bird

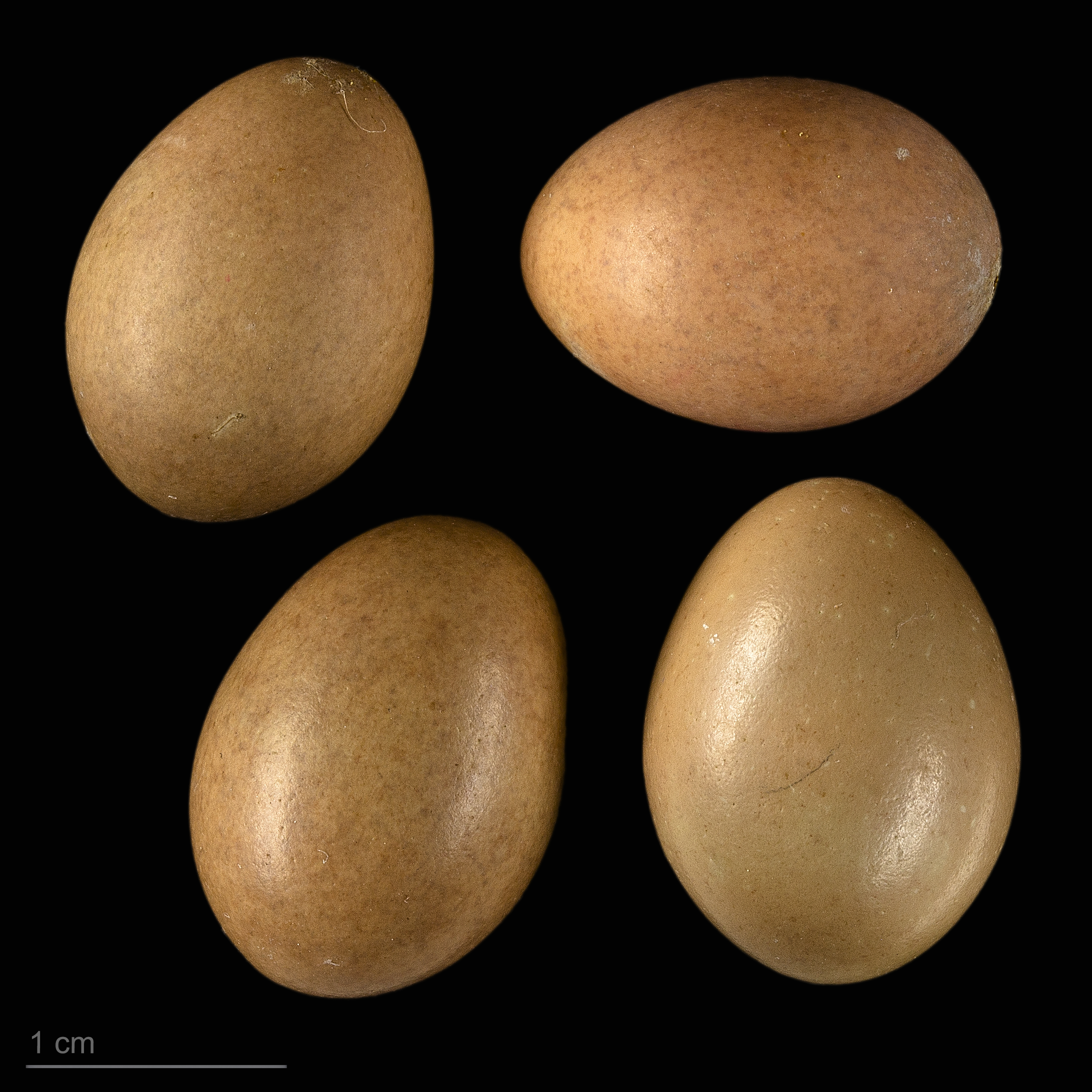
Locustella certhiola - MHNT

Pallas's grasshopper warbler (Helopsaltes certhiola), also known as the rusty-rumped warbler, is an Old World warbler in the genus Helopsaltes. It breeds in the eastern Palearctic: from the Altai Mountains, Mongolia and Transbaikalia to northeastern China, the Korean Peninsula, and islands in the Sea of Okhotsk (Sakhalin and Kuril Islands). It is migratory, wintering from India eastward to Indonesia. It is a rare migrant in Sri Lanka.

== Etymology ==
This bird was named after the German zoologist Peter Simon Pallas. The specific certhiola is a diminutive from the genus Certhia, the treecreepers.

The sixth edition of Clements Checklist refers to this species as "Pallas's warbler", a name more commonly used for Phylloscopus proregulus.

== Habitat ==
This small passerine bird is found in tall grass with some thicker vegetation, usually close to water in bogs or wet meadows. From 4 to 7 eggs are laid in a nest on the ground in grass. This species is a very rare vagrant to western Europe. One of the best places to see this skulking species as a vagrant is Fair Isle, Shetland; for a species that only rarely appears in western Europe, it can be found there with some regularity.

== Description ==
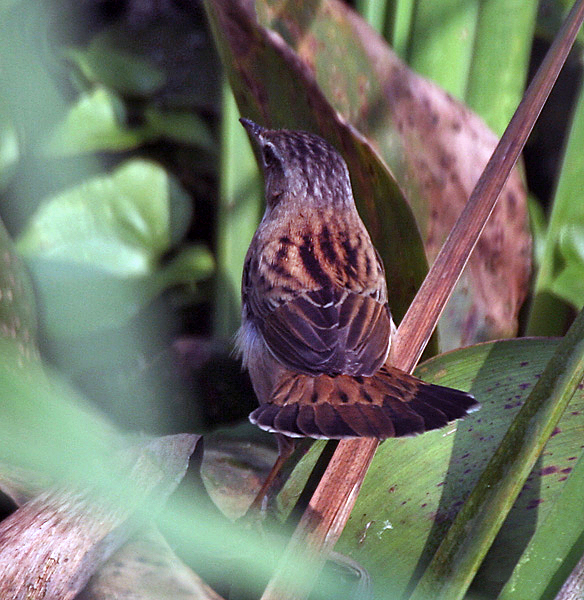
In Kolkata, West Bengal, India.

This is a medium-sized warbler. The adult has a streaked brown back, whitish grey underparts, unstreaked except on the undertail. The sexes are identical, as with most warblers, but young birds are yellower below. Like most warblers, it is insectivorous. It is very similar to the common grasshopper warbler, but is slightly larger, has white tips to the tail and tertial feathers, and a warmer brown rump. The white tips are the reason for its colloquial, mnemonic name of "PG Tips".

This is a skulking species which is very difficult to see except sometimes when singing. It creeps through grass and low foliage.

== Voice ==
The song is not the mechanical insect-like reeling produced by the common grasshopper warbler and some other Locustella warblers, but an inventive Acrocephalus-like melody.

== Subspecies ==
Five subspecies recognized:

- H. c. rubescens Blyth, 1845
- H. c. sparsimstriatus Meise, 1934
- H. c. certhiola (Pallas, 1811)
- H. c. centralasiae Sushkin, 1925
- H. c. minor David & Oustalet, 1877
