= List of birds of Korea =

This is a list of all birds recorded in the wild in the Korean Peninsula and its islands.

== Loons ==
Order: Gaviiformes Family: Gaviidae

The loons migrate to Korea during the winter months. They are carnivores and some species can dive more than 200 feet below the surface of the water to search for food.

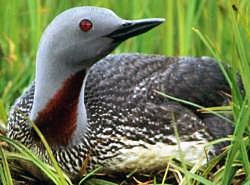
The red-throated loon visits the southern coasts during winter

- Red-throated loon, Gavia stellata
- Black-throated loon, Gavia arctica
- Pacific loon, Gavia pacifica
- Yellow-billed loon, Gavia adamsii

== Grebes ==
Order: Podicipediformes Family: Podicipedidae

Grebes are small to medium-large in size, have lobed toes and are excellent swimmers and divers. However, they have their feet placed far back on the body, making them quite ungainly on land. They leave the water only to nest, walking very short distances upright like penguins. They can run for a short distance, but often fall over.

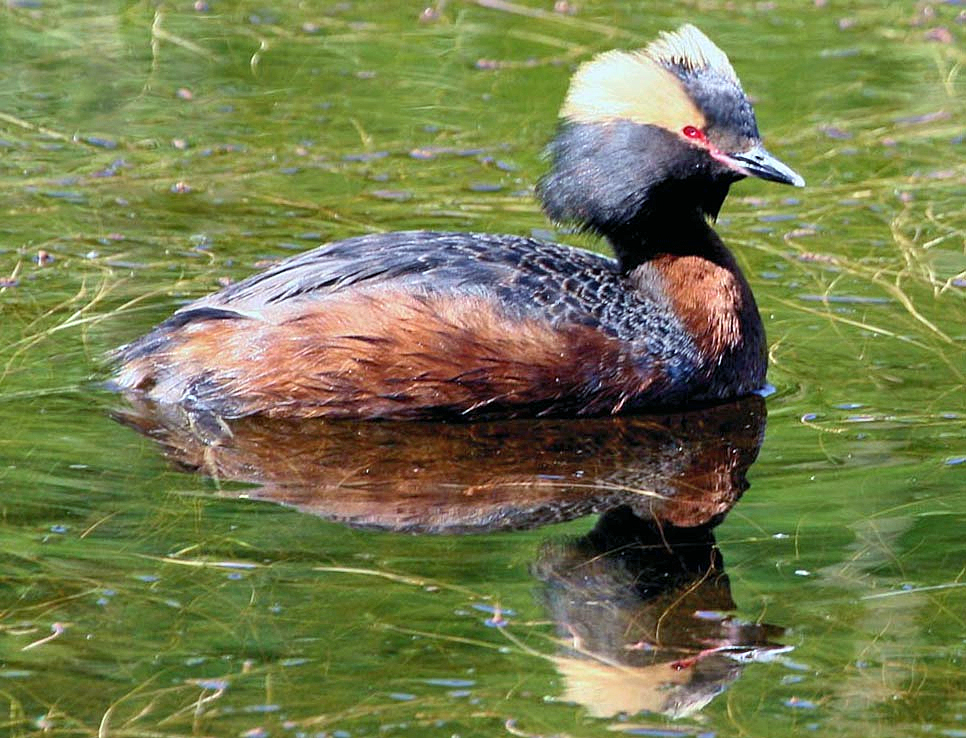
Horned grebe

- Little grebe, Tachybaptus ruficollis
- Red-necked grebe, Podiceps grisegena
- Great crested grebe, Podiceps cristatus
- Horned grebe, Podiceps auritus
- Black-necked grebe, Podiceps nigricollis

== Albatrosses ==
Order: Procellariidae Family: Diomedeidae Once common, it was brought to the edge of extinction by the trade in feathers, but with protection has recently made a recovery. Their main diet consists of squid, however they are known to follow fishing vessels for the left over morsels.

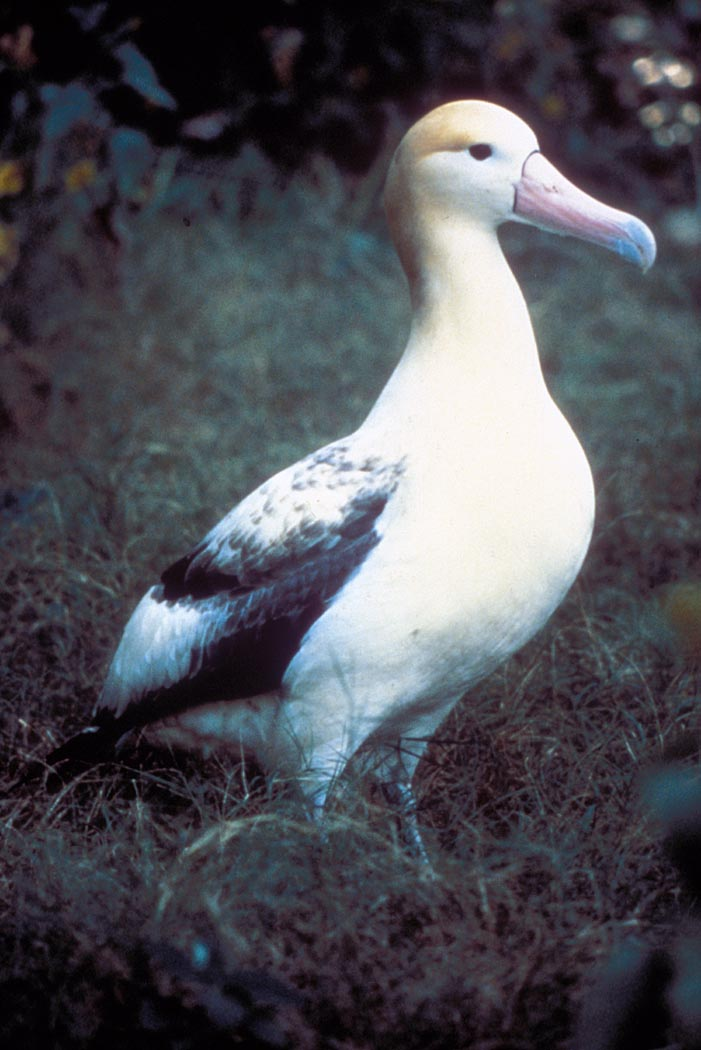
Phoebastria albatrus

- Short-tailed albatross, Phoebastria albatrus

== Petrels and shearwaters ==
Order: Procellariiformes Family: Procellariidae

The family Procellariidae is the main radiation of medium-sized "true petrels", characterised by united nostrils with medium septum and a long outer functional primary. It is dominant in the Southern Oceans, but not so in the Northern Hemisphere.

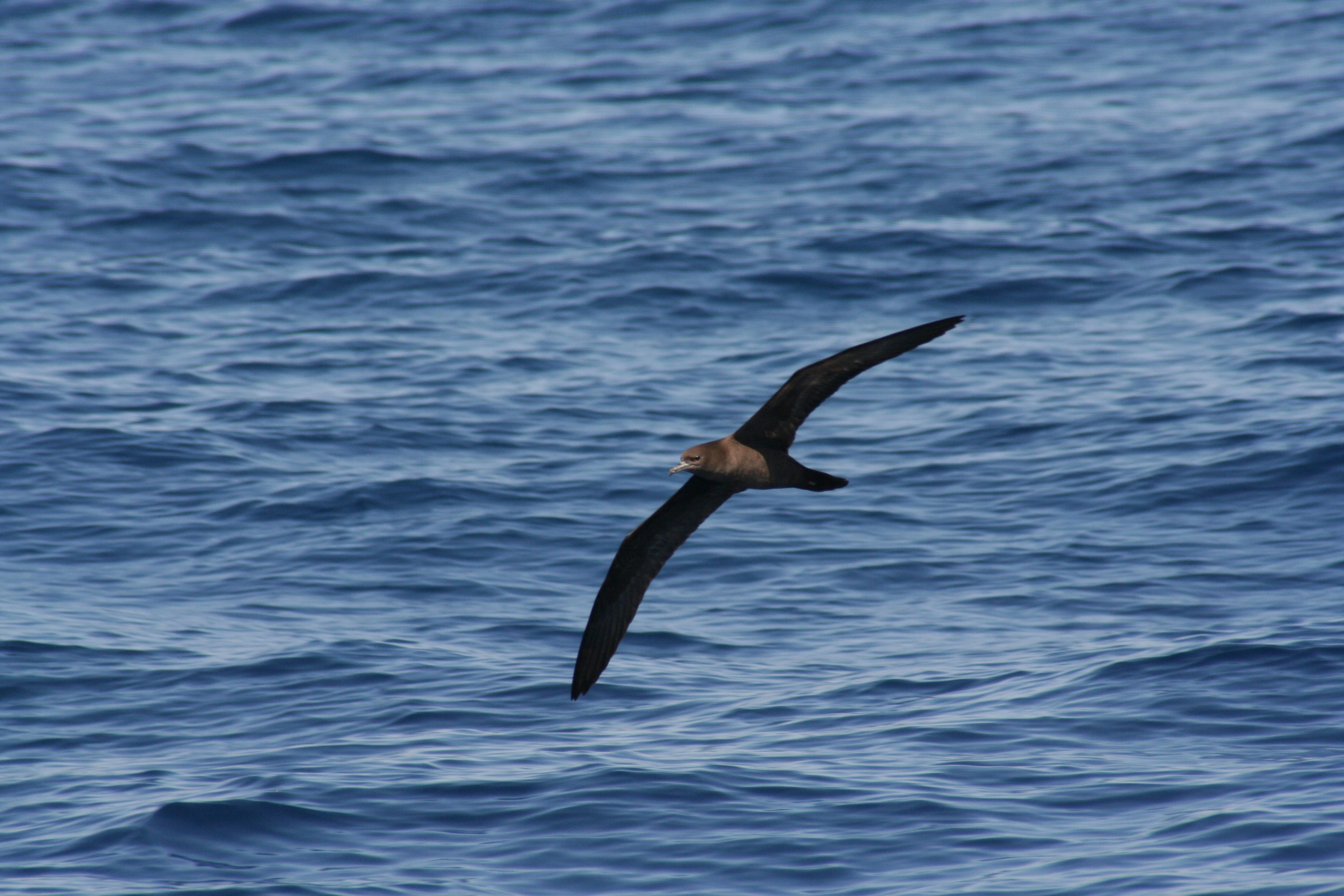
Flesh-footed shearwater

- Streaked shearwater, Calonectris leucomelas
- Flesh-footed shearwater, Puffinus carneipes
- Short-tailed shearwater, Puffinus tenuirostris
- Bonin petrel, Pterodroma hypoleuca

== Storm petrels ==
Order: Procellariidae Family: Hydrobatidae

It breeds on islands in the northwest Pacific off China, Japan and Korea. It nests in colonies close to the sea in rock crevices and lays a single white egg. It spends the rest of the year at sea, ranging into the Indian Ocean and Arabian Sea. It is essentially dark brown in all plumages, and has a fluttering flight, pattering on the water surface as it picks planktonic food items from the ocean surface.

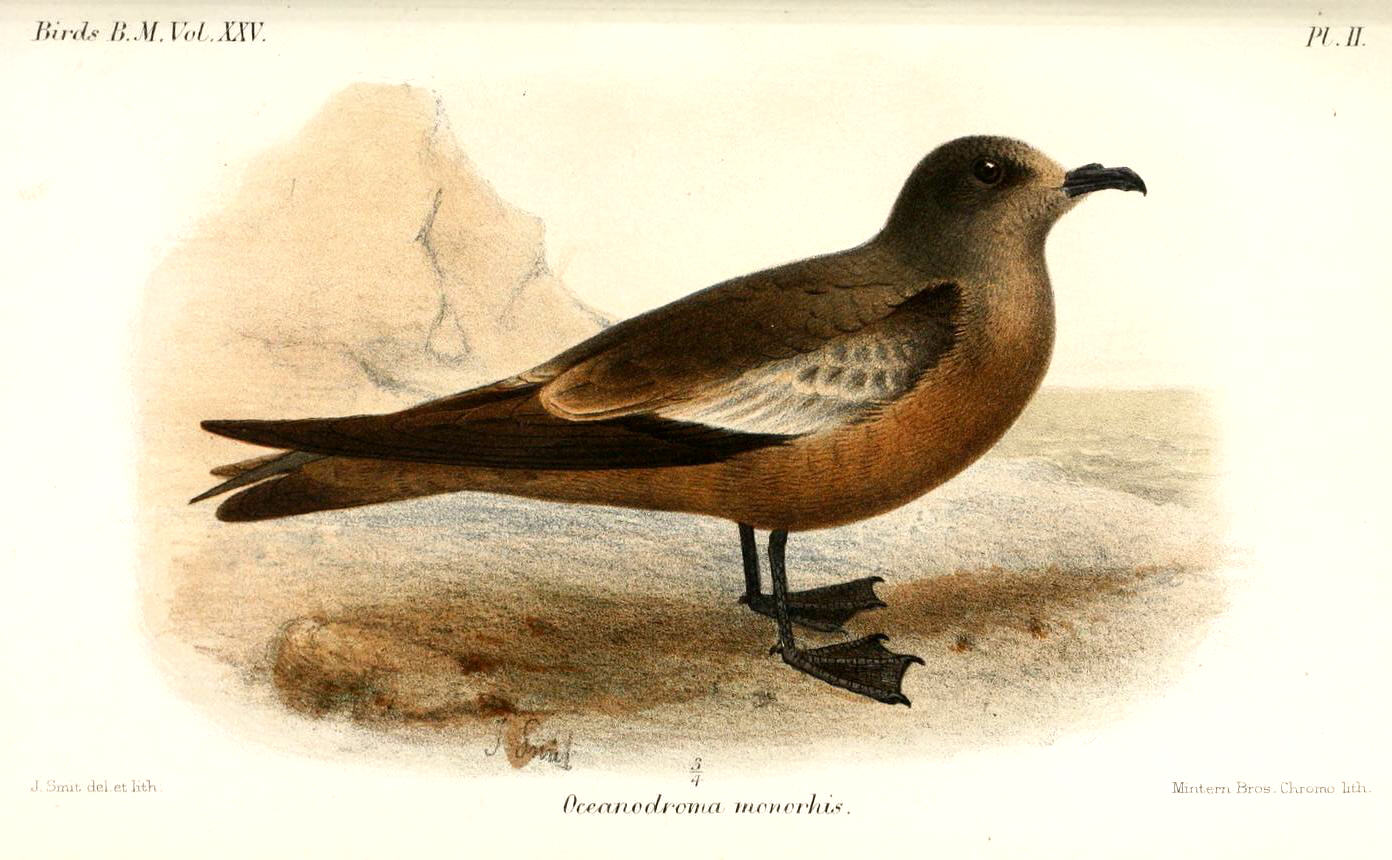
Oceanodroma monorhis

- Swinhoe's storm-petrel, Oceanodroma monorhis

== Boobies ==
Order: Suliformes Family: Sulidae

This group comprises medium to large coastal seabirds that plunge-dive for fish.

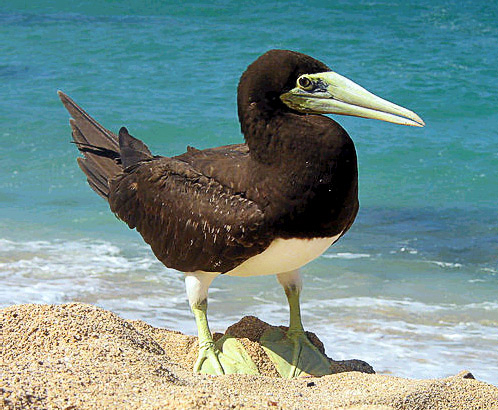
Brown booby

- Brown booby, Sula leucogaster
- Masked booby, Sula dactylatra

== Cormorants ==
Order: Suliformes Family: Phalacrocoracidae

Phalacrocoracidae is a family of medium to large coastal, fish-eating seabirds that includes cormorants and shags. Plumage colouration varies, with the majority having mainly dark plumage, some species being black-and-white and a few being colourful. There are 38 species worldwide and 4 species which occur in Korea.

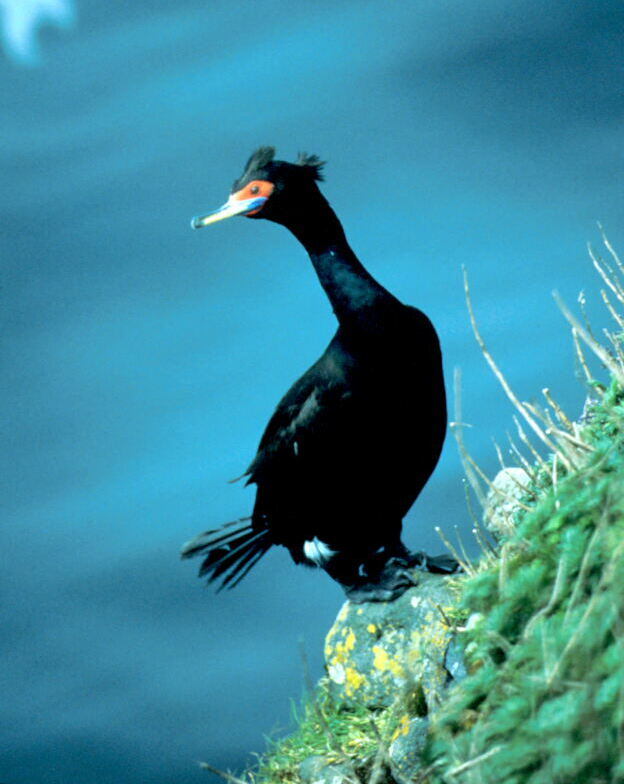
Red-faced cormorant

- Great cormorant, Phalacrocorax carbo
- Japanese cormorant, Phalacrocorax capillatus
- Pelagic cormorant, Urile pelagicus
- Red-faced cormorant, Urile urile

== Frigatebirds ==
Order: Suliformes Family: Fregatidae

Frigate birds are built for flying; they rarely swim and cannot walk but can manage to climb around the trees and bushes in which they nest. They have a very light skeleton and long narrow wings and are masters of the air.

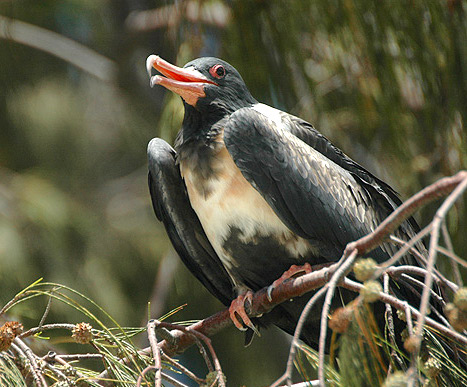
Lesser frigatebird

- Lesser frigatebird, Fregata ariel

== Pelicans ==
Order: Pelecaniformes Family: Pelecanidae

These large birds use their elastic pouches to catch fish—though different species use it in different ways. Many pelicans fish by swimming in cooperative groups. They may form a line or a "U" shape and drive fish into shallow water by beating their wings on the surface.

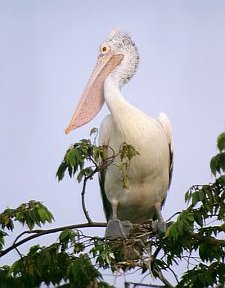
Pelecanus philippensis

- Spot-billed pelican Pelecanus philippensis
- Dalmatian pelican, Pelecanus crispus

== Herons ==
Order: Pelecaniformes Family: Ardeidae

Large wading birds found in most temperate regions but most numerous in tropical and subtropical areas. Most herons roost and nest in large colonies called heronries; others are gregarious only at breeding time; and some are entirely solitary.

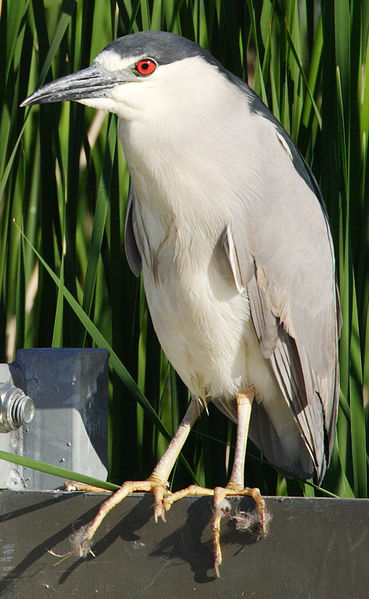
Black-crowned night-heron

- Eastern great egret, Ardea modesta
- Grey heron, Ardea cinerea
- Purple heron, Ardea purpurea
- Little egret, Egretta garzetta
- Chinese egret, Egretta eulophotes
- Pacific reef egret, Egretta sacra
- Intermediate egret, Mesophoyx intermedia
- Cattle egret, Bubulcus ibis
- Chinese pond heron, Ardeola bacchus
- Striated heron, Butorides striata
- Black-crowned night heron, Nycticorax nycticorax
- Japanese night heron, Gorsachius goisagi
- Yellow bittern, Ixobrychus sinensis
- Schrenck's bittern, Ixobrychus eurhythmus
- Cinnamon bittern, Ixobrychus cinnamomeus
- Black bittern, Ixobrychus flavicollis
- Great bittern, Botaurus stellaris

== Ibises and spoonbills ==
Order: Pelecaniformes Family: Threskiornithidae

Ibises and spoonbills occur primarily in freshwater and estuarine habitats, including swamps, marshes, coastal mangroves, rice fields, rivers and ponds. Ibises and spoonbills are widely distributed in the warmer regions of the world and are especially abundant in the tropics of Africa, Asia and South America.

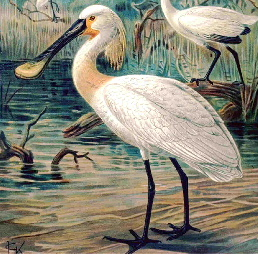
Eurasion spoonbill

- Black-headed ibis, Threskiornis melanocephalus
- Crested ibis, Nipponia nippon
- Eurasian spoonbill, Platalea leucorodia
- Black-faced spoonbill, Platalea minor

== Storks ==
Order: Ciconiiformes Family: Ciconiidae

The storks are large, long-legged, long-necked wading birds with long stout bills. They occur in most of the warmer regions of the world. They tend to live in drier habitats than their relatives the herons, spoonbills and ibises, and lack the powder down that those groups use to clean off fish slime. Many species are migratory. Storks eat frogs, fish and small birds or mammals

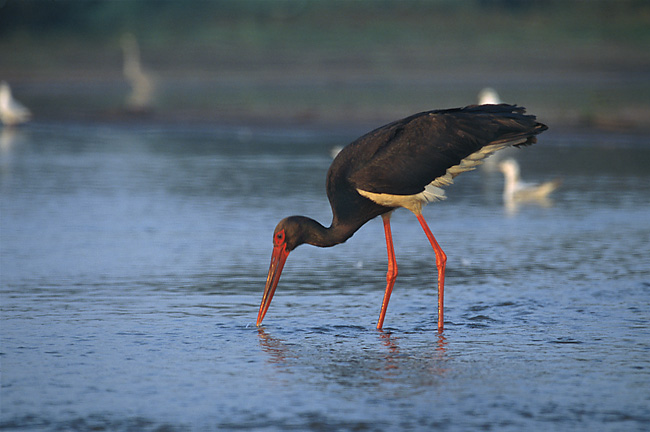
Black stork

- Black stork, Ciconia nigra
- Oriental stork, Ciconia boyciana

== Ducks, geese and swans ==
Order: Anseriformes Family: Anatidae

The family Anatidae includes the ducks and most duck-like waterfowl, such as geese and swans. These birds are adapted to an aquatic existence with webbed feet, bills which are flattened to a greater or lesser extent, and feathers that are excellent at shedding water due to special oils.

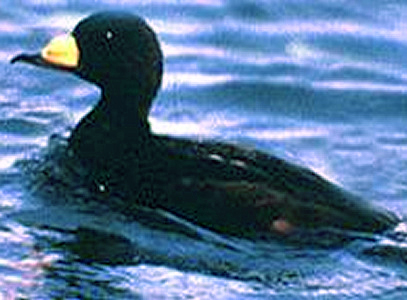
Black scoter

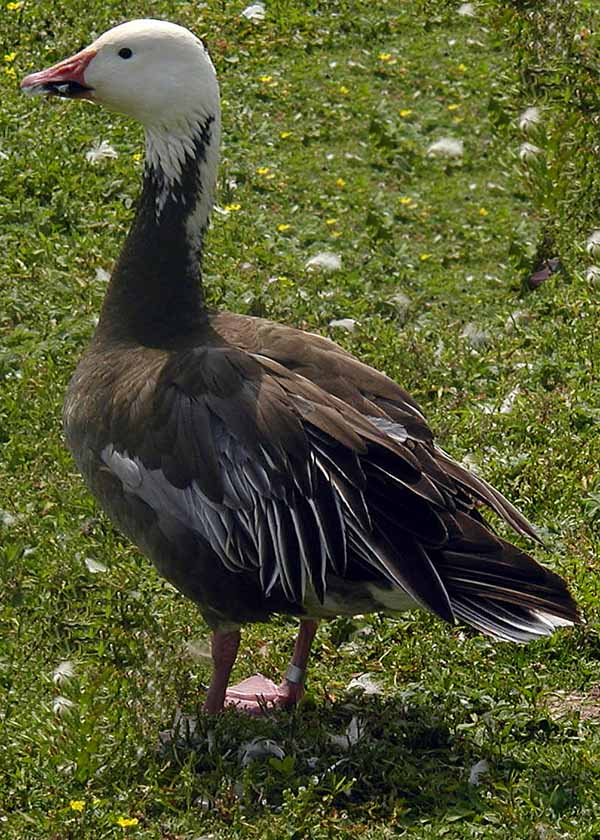
Snow goose

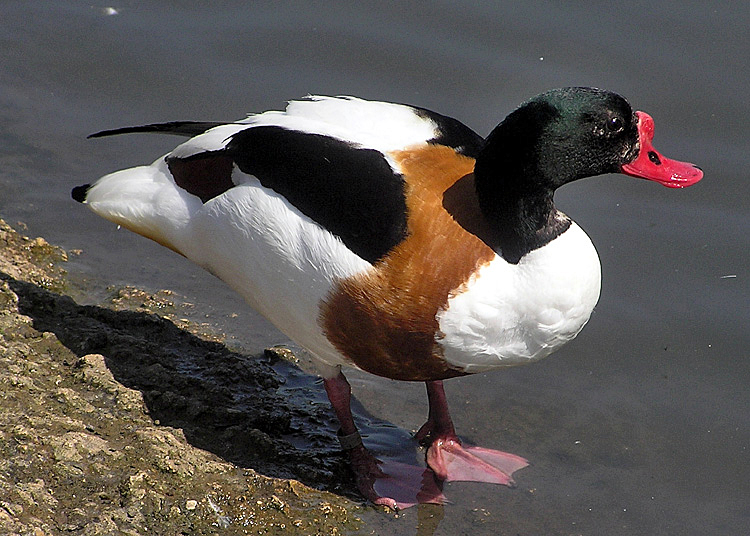
Common shelduck

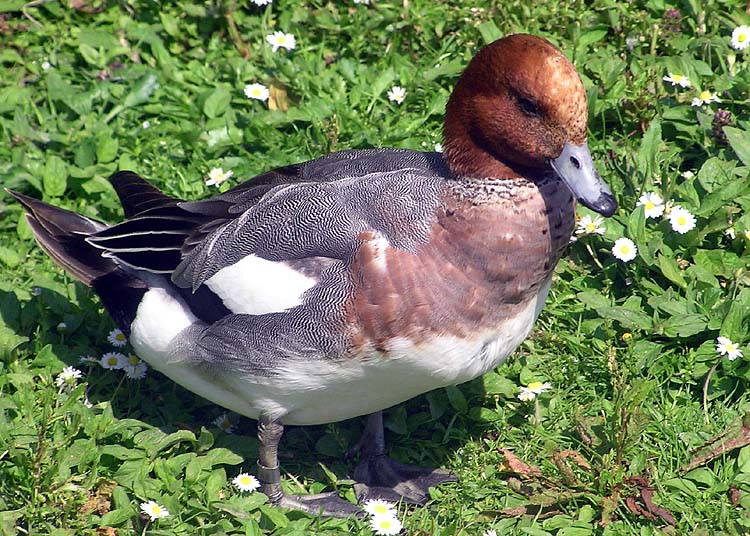
Eurasian wigeon

- Mute swan, Cygnus olor
- Whooper swan, Cygnus cygnus
- Tundra swan, Cygnus columbianus
- Swan goose, Anser cygnoides
- Taiga bean-goose, Anser fabalis
- Tundra bean-goose, Anser serrirostris
- Greater white-fronted goose, Anser albifrons
- Lesser white-fronted goose, Anser erythropus
- Greylag goose, Anser anser
- Snow goose, Chen caerulescens
- Emperor goose, Chen canagica
- Canada goose, Branta canadensis
- Brent goose, Branta bernicla
- Ruddy shelduck, Tadorna ferruginea
- Crested shelduck, Tadorna cristata
- Common shelduck, Tadorna tadorna
- Mandarin duck, Aix galericulata
- Gadwall, Anas strepera
- Falcated duck, Anas falcata
- Eurasian wigeon, Anas penelope
- American wigeon, Anas americana
- American black duck, Anas rubripes
- Mallard, Anas platyrhynchos
- Indian spot-billed duck, Anas poecilorhyncha
- Eastern spot-billed duck, Anas zonorhyncha
- Northern shoveler, Anas clypeata
- Northern pintail, Anas acuta
- Garganey, Anas querquedula
- Baikal teal, Anas formosa
- Common teal, Anas crecca
- Common pochard, Aythya ferina
- Canvasback, Aythya valisineria
- Redhead, Aythya americana
- Baer's pochard, Aythya baeri
- Tufted duck, Aythya fuligula
- Greater scaup, Aythya marila
- Red-crested pochard, Netta rufina
- Harlequin duck, Histrionicus histrionicus
- Long-tailed duck, Clangula hyemalis
- Black scoter, Melanitta americana
- Velvet scoter, Melanitta fusca
- Stejneger's scoter, Melanitta stejnegeri
- Common goldeneye, Bucephala clangula
- Barrow's goldeneye, Bucephala islandica
- Smew, Mergellus albellus
- Red-breasted merganser, Mergus serrator
- Scaly-sided merganser, Mergus squamatus
- Common merganser, Mergus merganser

== Osprey ==
Order: Accipitriformes Family: Pandionidae The osprey (Pandion haliaetus) is a medium large raptor which is a specialist fish-eater with a worldwide distribution. The osprey is particularly well adapted to its diet, with reversible outer toes, closable nostrils to keep out water during dives and backwards facing scales on the talons which act as barbs to help catch fish. It locates its prey from the air, often hovering prior to plunging feet-first into the water to seize a fish.

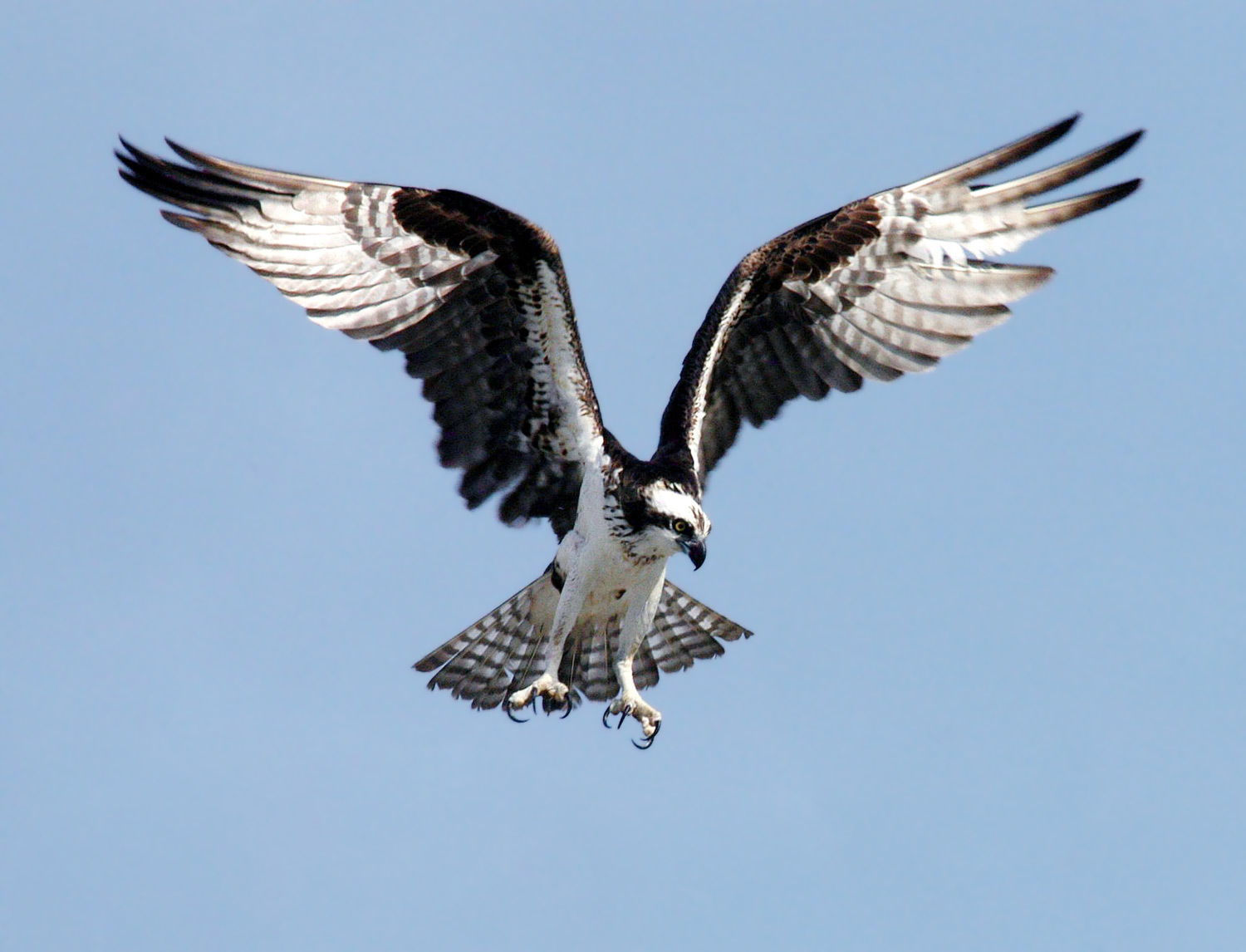
Osprey

- Osprey, Pandion haliaetus

== Hawks, kites and eagles ==
Order: Accipitriformes Family: Accipitridae

From the family Accipitridae, they range from small to large birds with strongly hooked bills and variable morphology based on diet. They feed on a range of prey items from insects to medium-sized mammals, with a number feeding on carrion

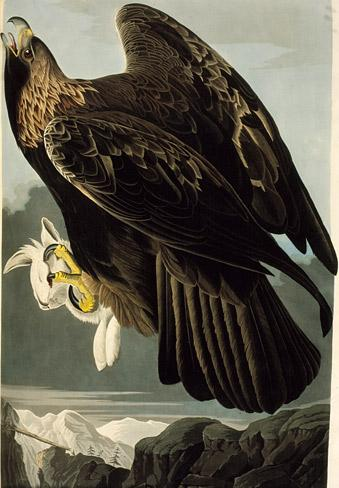
Golden eagle

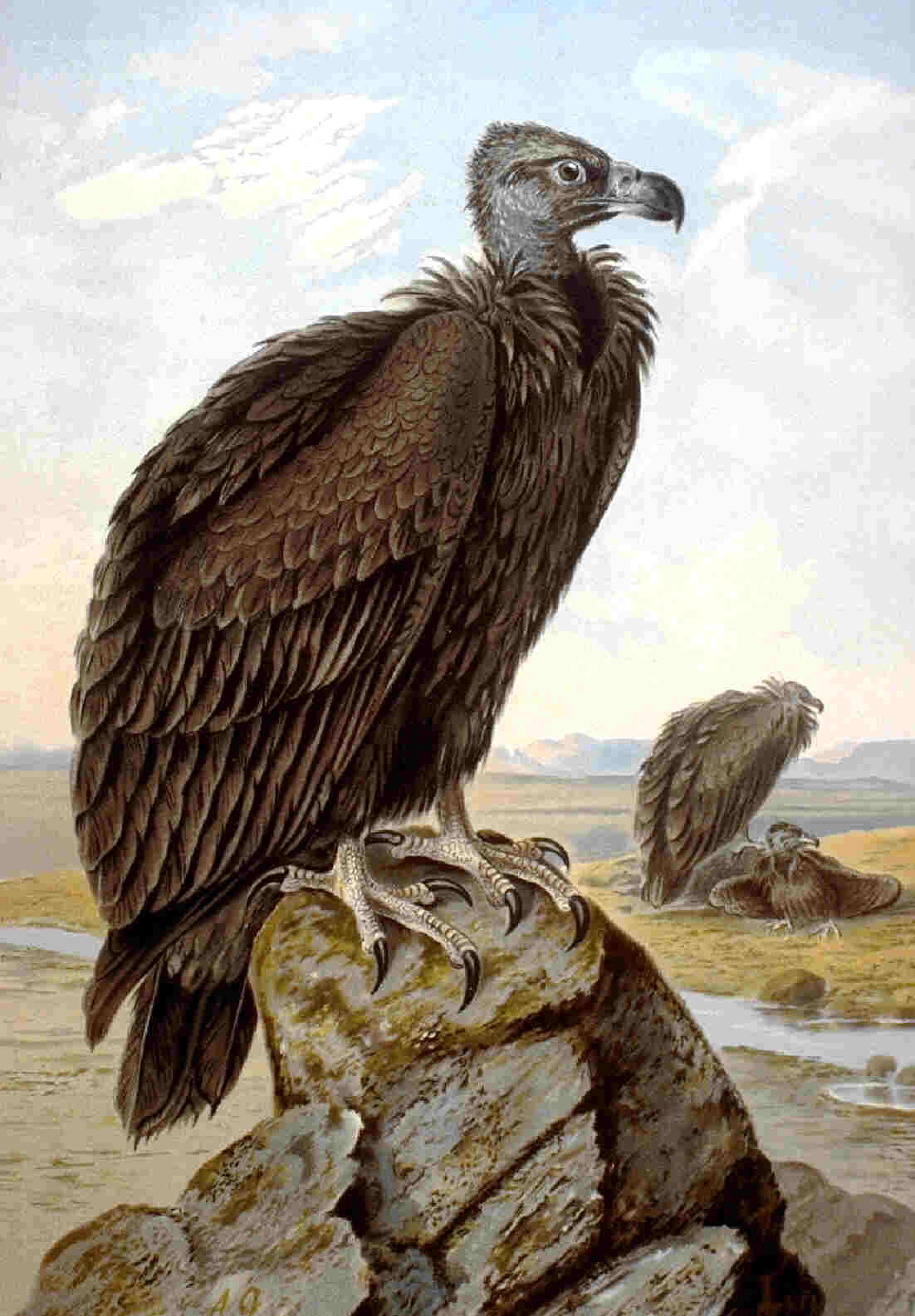
Eurasion black vulture

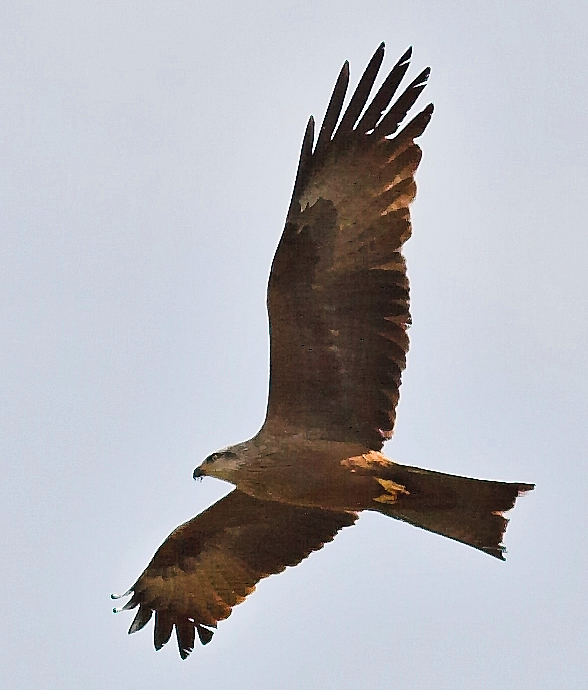
Black-eared kite

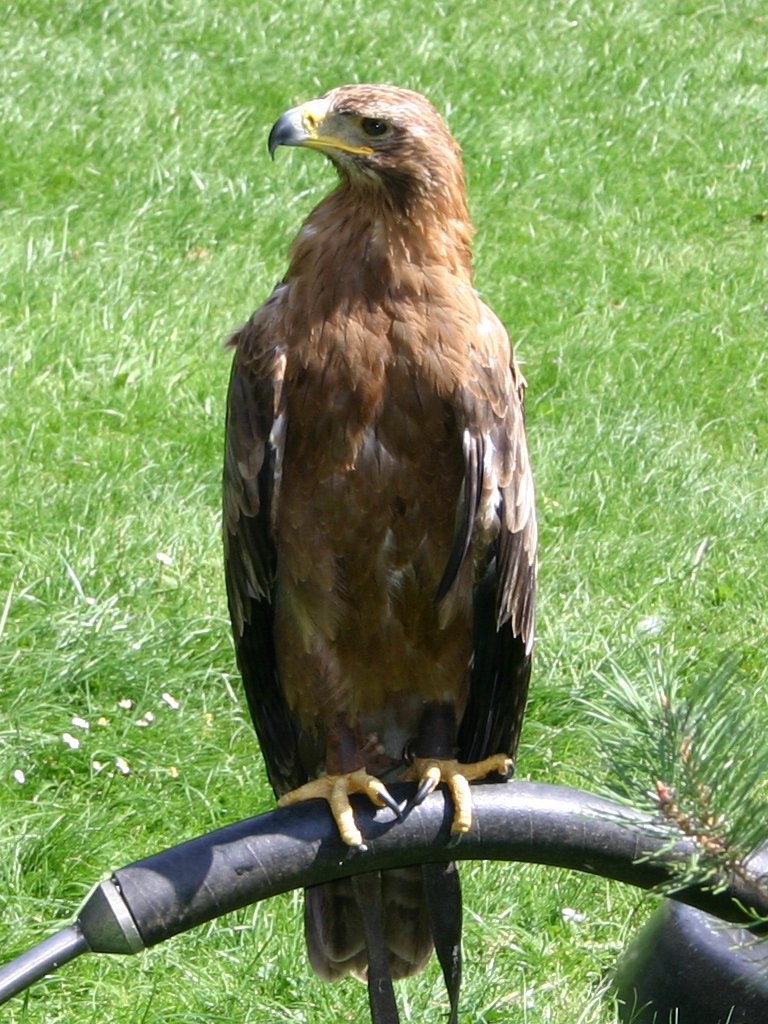
Steppe eagle

- Oriental honey-buzzard, Pernis ptilorhynchus
- Black-eared kite, Milvus migrans
- White-tailed eagle, Haliaeetus albicilla
- Steller's sea-eagle, Haliaeetus pelagicus
- Lammergeier, Gypaetus barbatus
- Eurasian black vulture, Aegypius monachus
- Eastern marsh-harrier, Circus spilonotus
- Northern harrier, Circus cyaneus
- Pied harrier, Circus melanoleucos
- Japanese sparrowhawk, Accipiter gularis
- Eurasian sparrowhawk, Accipiter nisus
- Northern goshawk, Accipiter gentilis
- Chinese sparrowhawk, Accipiter soloensis
- Grey-faced buzzard, Butastur indicus
- Common buzzard, Buteo buteo
- Upland buzzard, Buteo hemilasius
- Rough-legged hawk, Buteo lagopus
- Greater spotted eagle, Clanga clanga
- Steppe eagle, Aquila nipalensis
- Eastern imperial eagle, Aquila heliaca
- Golden eagle, Aquila chrysaetos
- Mountain hawk-eagle, Nisaetus nipalensis
- Crested serpent eagle, Spilornis cheela

== Falcons ==
Order: Falconiformes Family: Falconidae

Falcons have thin, pointed wings, which allow them to dive at extremely high speeds. (Peregrine falcons, the fastest animals on Earth, are said to have reached speeds of up to 200 mph.)

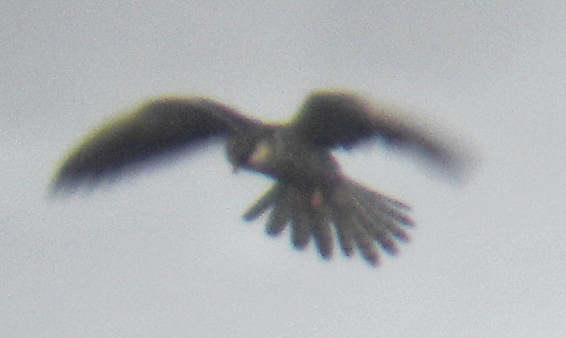
Falco amurensis

- Peregrine falcon, Falco peregrinus
- Eurasian hobby, Falco subbuteo
- Common kestrel, Falco tinnunculus
- Amur falcon, Falco amurensis
- Merlin, Falco columbarius
- Saker falcon, Falco cherrug

== Pheasants and grouse ==
Order: Galliformes Family: Phasianidae

Phasianidae consists of the pheasants and their allies; the grouse are sometimes considered to make up a separate family, the Tetraonidae. These are terrestrial species, variable in size but generally plump with broad relatively short wings. Many species are gamebirds or have been domesticated as a food source for humans. There are 180 species worldwide and 4 species in Korea.

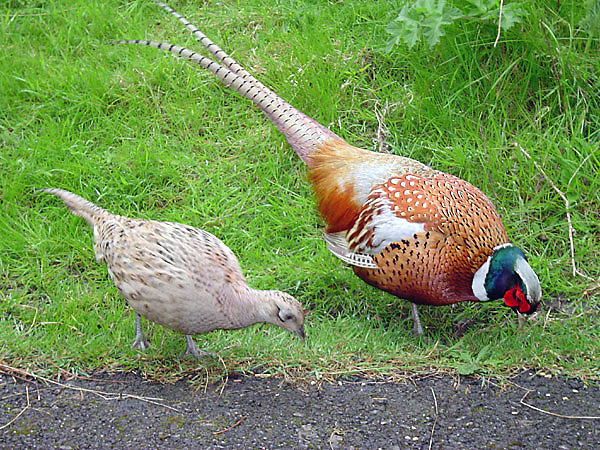
Common pheasant

- Japanese quail, Coturnix japonica
- Common pheasant, Phasianus colchicus
- Black grouse, Lyrurus tetrix
- Hazel grouse, Tetrastes bonasia

== Buttonquail ==
Order: Turniciformes Family: Turnicidae

The buttonquails or hemipodes are a small family of birds which resemble, but are unrelated to, the true quails. This is an Old World group, which inhabits warm grasslands. Buttonquail are small drab running birds, which avoid flying. The female is the brighter of the sexes and initiates courtship. The male incubates the eggs and tends the young. There are 15 species worldwide, with 1 species in Korea.

- Yellow-legged buttonquail, Turnix tanki

== Cranes ==
Order: Gruiformes Family: Gruidae

Cranes are large, long-legged and long-necked birds. Unlike the similar-looking but unrelated herons, cranes fly with necks outstretched, not pulled back. Most have elaborate and noisy courting displays or "dances". There are 15 species worldwide, 7 Korean species.

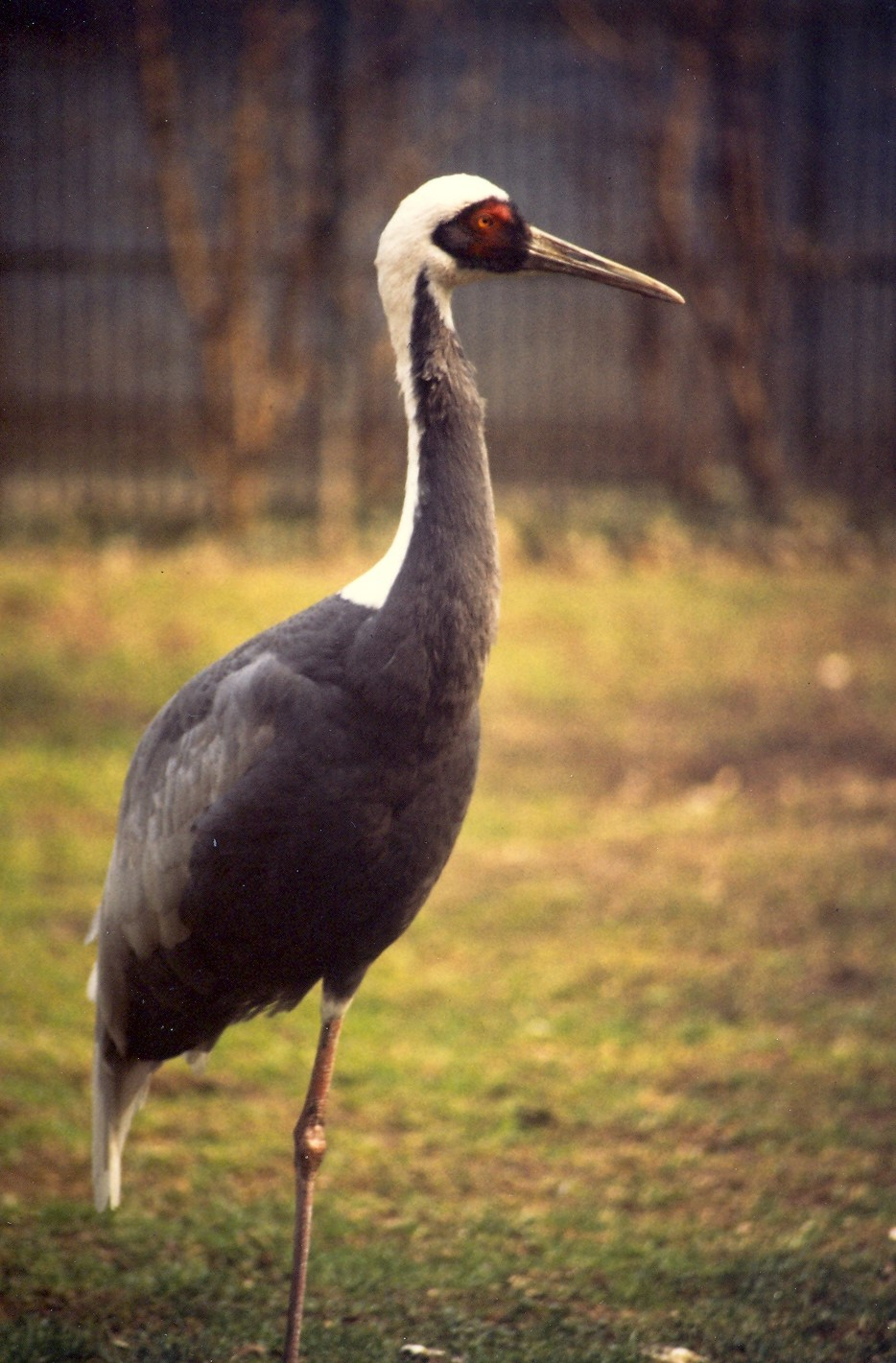
White-naped crane

- White-naped crane, Grus vipio
- Hooded crane, Grus monacha
- Red-crowned crane, Grus japonensis
- Siberian crane, Grus leucogeranus
- Sandhill crane, Grus canadensis
- Common crane, Grus grus
- Demoiselle crane, Anthropoides virgo

== Rails and crakes ==
Order: Gruiformes Family: Rallidae

Rallidae is a large family of small to medium-sized birds, including rails, crakes, coots and gallinules. The most typical family members occupy dense vegetation in damp environments near lakes, swamps or rivers. In general they are shy and secretive birds and thus difficult to observe. Most species have strong legs and long toes which are well adapted to soft uneven surfaces. They tend to have short, rounded wings and to be weak fliers. There are 143 species worldwide and 9 Korean species.

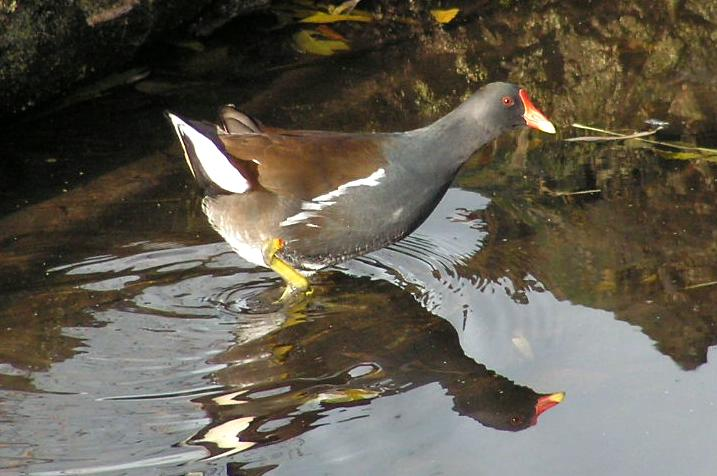
Gallinula chloropus

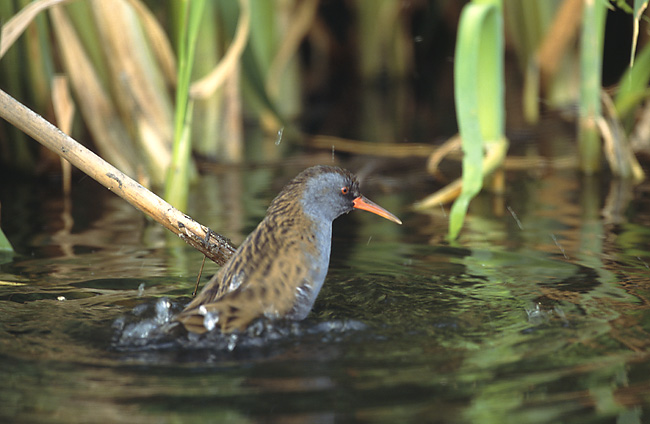
Water rail

- Swinhoe's rail, Coturnicops exquisitus
- Water rail, Rallus aquaticus
- White-breasted waterhen, Amaurornis phoenicurus
- Baillon's crake, Porzana pusilla
- Ruddy-breasted crake, Porzana fusca
- Band-bellied crake, Porzana paykullii
- Watercock, Gallicrex cinerea
- Common moorhen, Gallinula chloropus
- Common coot, Fulica atra

== Bustards ==
Order: Otidiformes Family: Otididae

Bustards, including floricans and korhaans, are large terrestrial birds mainly associated with dry open country and steppes in the Old World. They make up the family Otididae (formerly known as Otidae). Bustards are all fairly large and two species, the kori bustard and the great bustards are frequently cited as the world's heaviest flying birds, since both may exceed 20 kg (44 lbs).

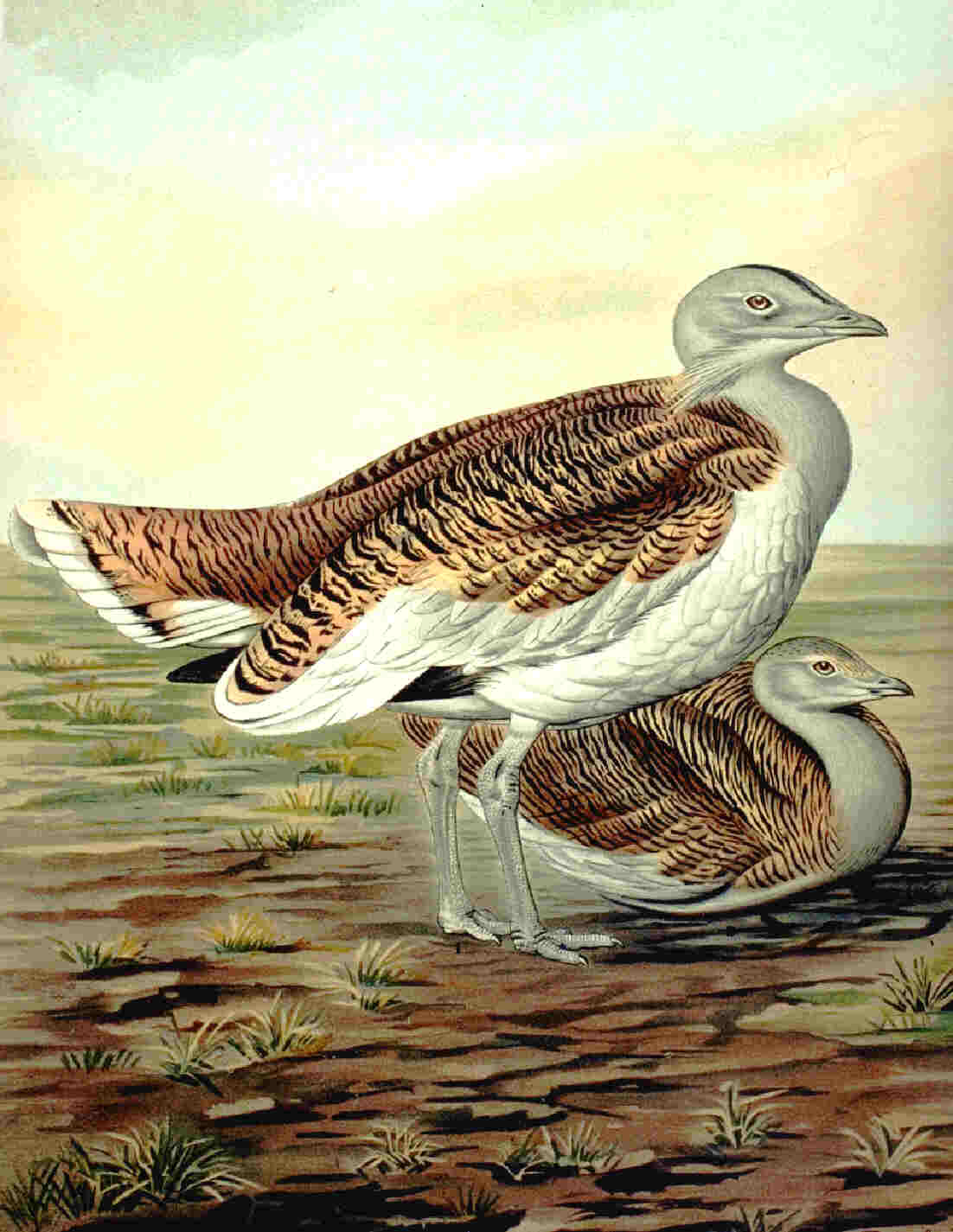
Otis tarda

- Great bustard, Otis tarda

== Jacanas ==
Order: Charadriiformes Family: Jacanidae

Jacanas are identifiable by their huge feet and claws which enable them to walk on floating vegetation in the shallow lakes that are their preferred habitat. The females are larger than the males, and some species are polyandrous. However, adults of both sexes look identical, as with most shorebirds. They feed on insects and other invertebrates picked from the floating vegetation or the water's surface. Most species are sedentary, but the pheasant-tailed jacana migrates from the north of its range into peninsular India and southeast Asia. It is the only one of the world's 8 jacana species found in Korea.

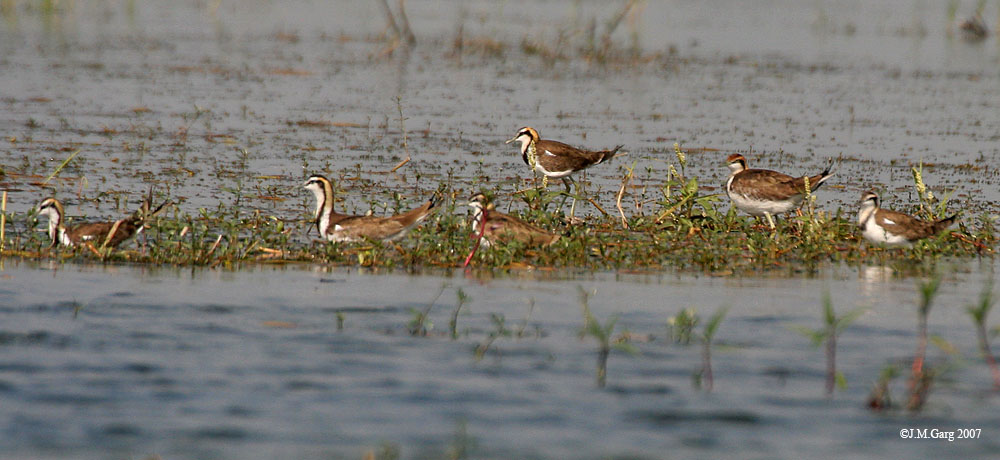
Pheasant-tailed jacanas

- Pheasant-tailed jacana, Hydrophasianus chirurgus

== Painted snipes ==
Order: Charadriiformes Family: Rostratulidae

Painted snipes are short-legged, long-billed birds similar in shape to the true snipes, but much more brightly coloured. The female is brighter than the male and takes the lead in courtship. The male incubates the eggs, usually four, in a nest on the ground or floating for about 20 days. All three species live in reedy swampland, and their diet consists of annelid worms and other invertebrates, which they find with their long bills. There are 3 species worldwide, of which only one is recorded from Korea.

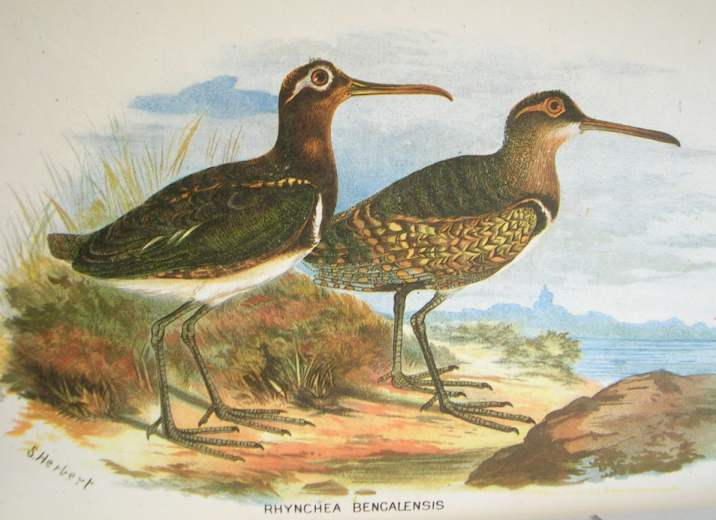
Greater painted-snipe

- Greater painted-snipe, Rostratula benghalensis

== Oystercatchers ==
Order: Charadriiformes Family: Haematopodidae

The oystercatchers are large, obvious and noisy plover-like birds, with strong bills used for smashing or prising open molluscs. There are 11 species worldwide and 1 Korean species.

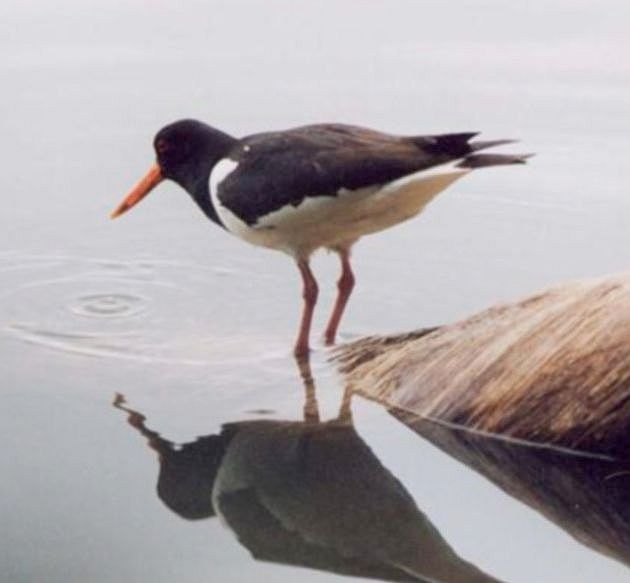
Eurasian Oystercatcher

- Eurasian oystercatcher, Haematopus ostralegus

== Stilts and avocets ==
Order: Charadriiformes Family: Recurvirostridae

Recurvirostridae is a family of large wading birds, which includes the avocets and stilts. The avocets have long legs and long up-curved bills. The stilts have extremely long legs and long, thin, straight bills. There are 9 species worldwide and 2 Korean species.

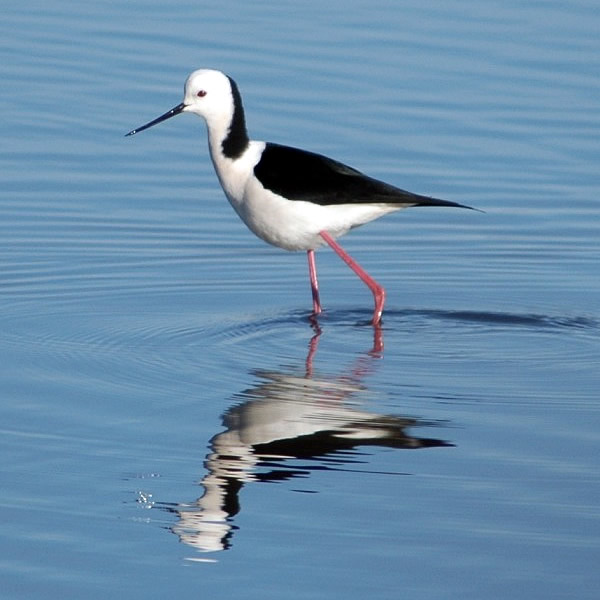
Black-winged stilt

- Black-winged stilt, Himantopus himantopus
- Pied avocet, Recurvirostra avosetta

== Coursers and pratincoles ==
Order: Charadriiformes Family: Glareolidae

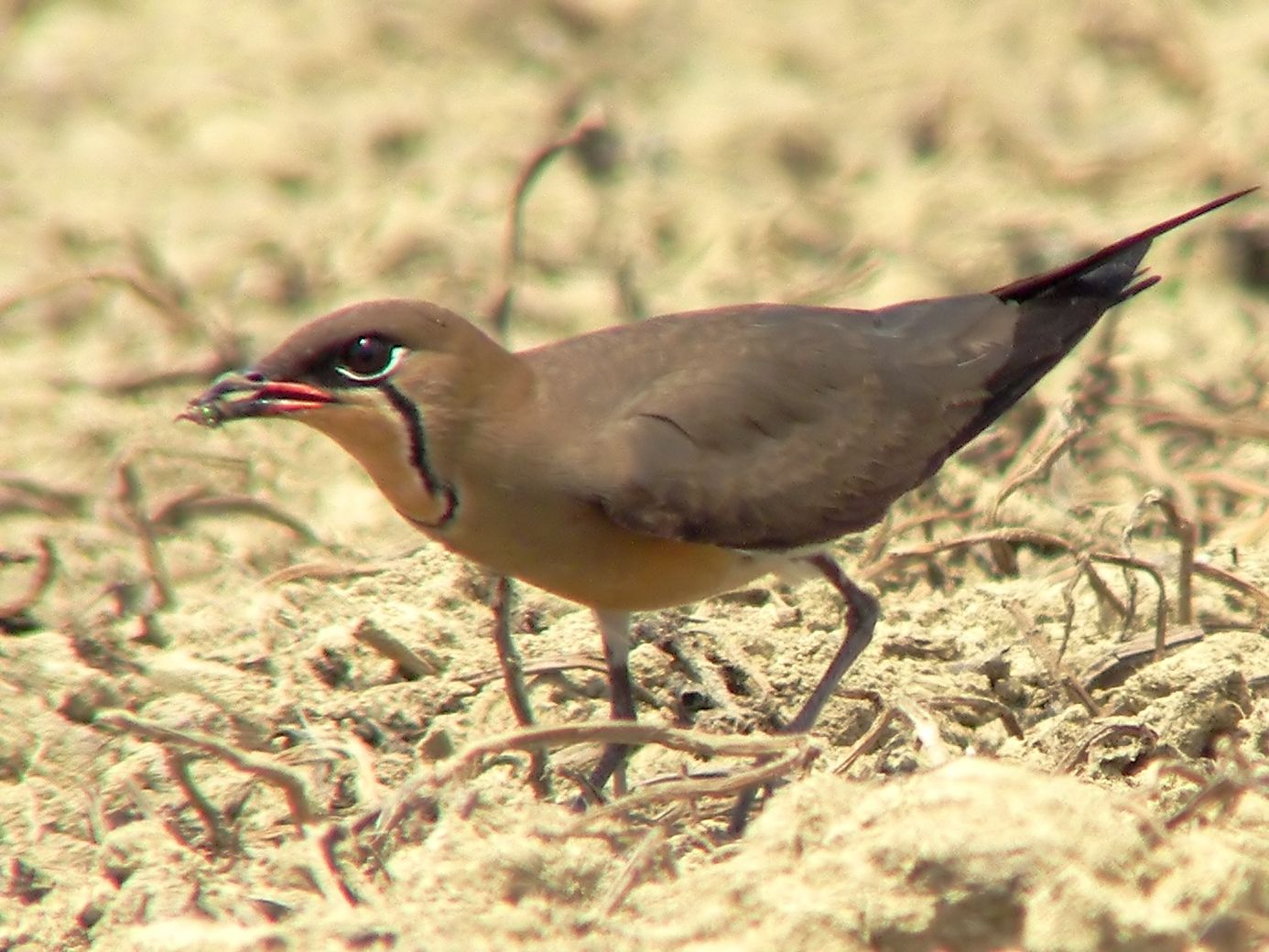
Oriental pratincole

- Oriental pratincole, Glareola maldivarum

== Plovers and lapwings ==
Order: Charadriiformes Family: Charadriidae

The family Charadriidae includes the plovers, dotterels and lapwings. They are small to medium-sized birds with compact bodies, short, thick necks and long, usually pointed, wings. They are found in open country worldwide, mostly in habitats near water. There are 66 species worldwide and 12 Korean species, of which 3 breed in Korea.

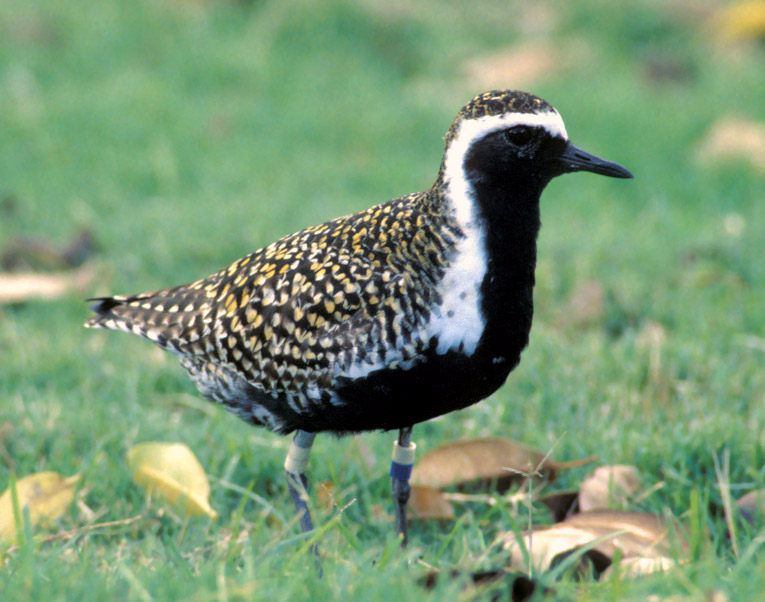
Pacific golden plover

- Pacific golden plover, Pluvialis fulva
- Grey plover, Pluvialis squatarola
- Common ringed plover, Charadrius hiaticula
- Long-billed plover, Charadrius placidus
- Little ringed plover, Charadrius dubius
- Kentish plover, Charadrius alexandrinus
- Mongolian plover, Charadrius mongolus
- Greater sand plover, Charadrius leschenaultii
- Caspian plover, Charadrius asiaticus
- Northern lapwing, Vanellus vanellus
- Grey-headed lapwing, Vanellus cinereus

== Waders ==
Order: Charadriiformes Family: Scolopacidae

Scolopacidae is a large diverse family of small to medium-sized shorebirds including the sandpipers, curlews, godwits, shanks, tattlers, woodcocks, snipes, dowitchers and phalaropes. The majority of these species eat small invertebrates picked out of the mud or soil. Different lengths of legs and bills enable multiple species to feed in the same habitat, particularly on the coast, without direct competition for food.

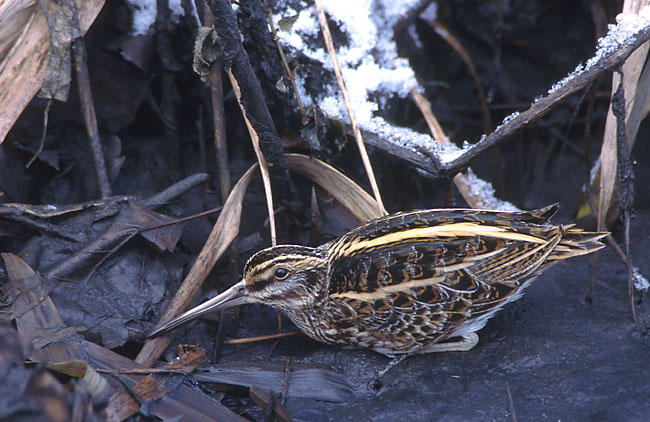
Jack snipe

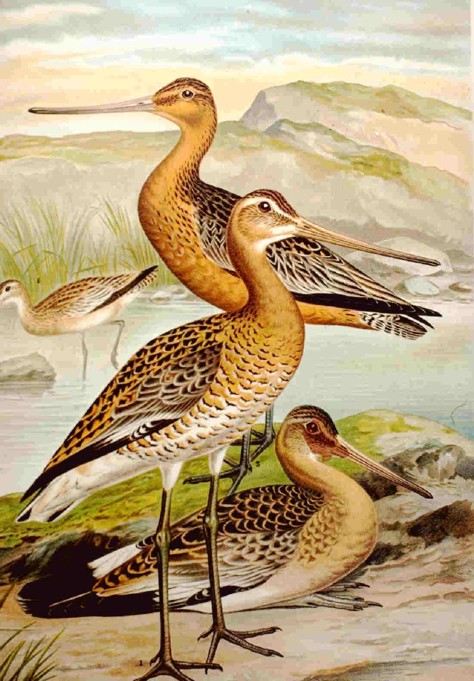
Black-tailed godwit

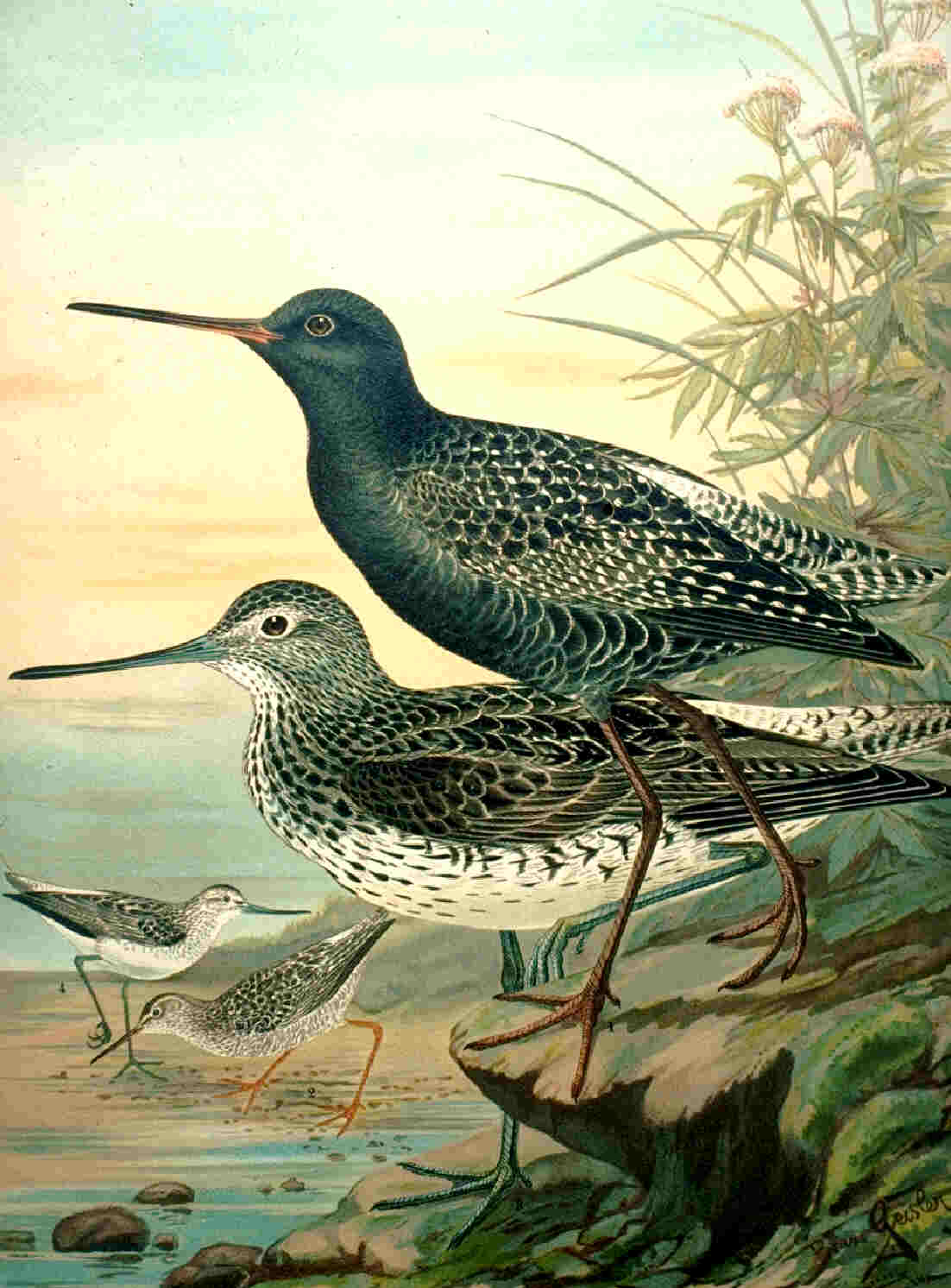
Spotted redshank

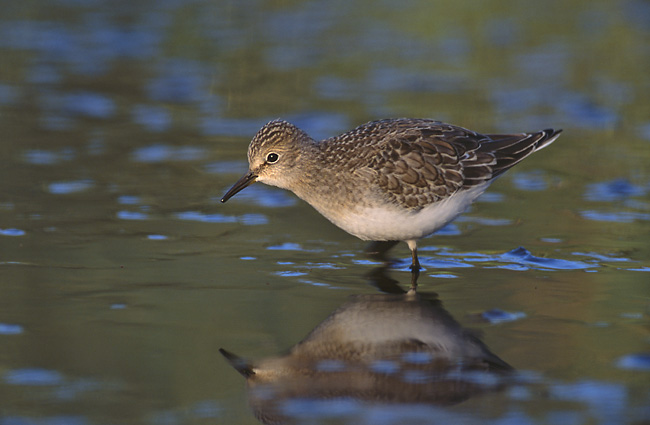
Temminck's stint

- Eurasian woodcock, Scolopax rusticola
- Solitary snipe, Gallinago solitaria
- Latham's snipe, Gallinago hardwickii
- Pintail snipe, Gallinago stenura
- Swinhoe's snipe, Gallinago megala
- Common snipe, Gallinago gallinago
- Jack snipe, Lymnocryptes minimus
- Black-tailed godwit, Limosa limosa
- Bar-tailed godwit, Limosa lapponica
- Little curlew, Numenius minutus
- Eurasian whimbrel, Numenius phaeopus
- Eurasian curlew, Numenius arquata
- Far Eastern curlew, Numenius madagascariensis
- Spotted redshank, Tringa erythropus
- Common redshank, Tringa totanus
- Common greenshank, Tringa nebularia
- Marsh sandpiper, Tringa stagnatilis
- Wood sandpiper, Tringa glareola
- Nordmann's greenshank, Tringa guttifer
- Greater yellowlegs, Tringa melanoleuca
- Grey-tailed tattler, Tringa brevipes
- Green sandpiper, Tringa ochropus
- Terek sandpiper, Xenus cinereus
- Common sandpiper, Actitis hypoleucos
- Ruddy turnstone, Arenaria interpres
- Long-billed dowitcher, Limnodromus scolopaceus
- Asian dowitcher, Limnodromus semipalmatus
- Great knot, Calidris tenuirostris
- Red knot, Calidris canutus
- Sanderling, Calidris alba
- Red-necked stint, Calidris ruficollis
- Temminck's stint, Calidris temminckii
- Little stint, Calidris minuta
- Long-toed stint, Calidris subminuta
- Pectoral sandpiper, Calidris melanotos
- Sharp-tailed sandpiper, Calidris acuminata
- Dunlin, Calidris alpina
- Curlew sandpiper, Calidris ferruginea
- Buff-breasted sandpiper, Tryngites subruficollis
- Spoonbill sandpiper, Eurynorhynchus pygmeus
- Broad-billed sandpiper, Limicola falcinellus
- Ruff, Philomachus pugnax
- Red-necked phalarope, Phalaropus lobatus
- Red phalarope, Phalaropus fulicaria
- Wilson's phalarope, Steganopus tricolor

== Skuas, gulls, terns and skimmers ==
Order: Charadriiformes Family: Laridae

There are 91 species worldwide and 23 species in Korea.

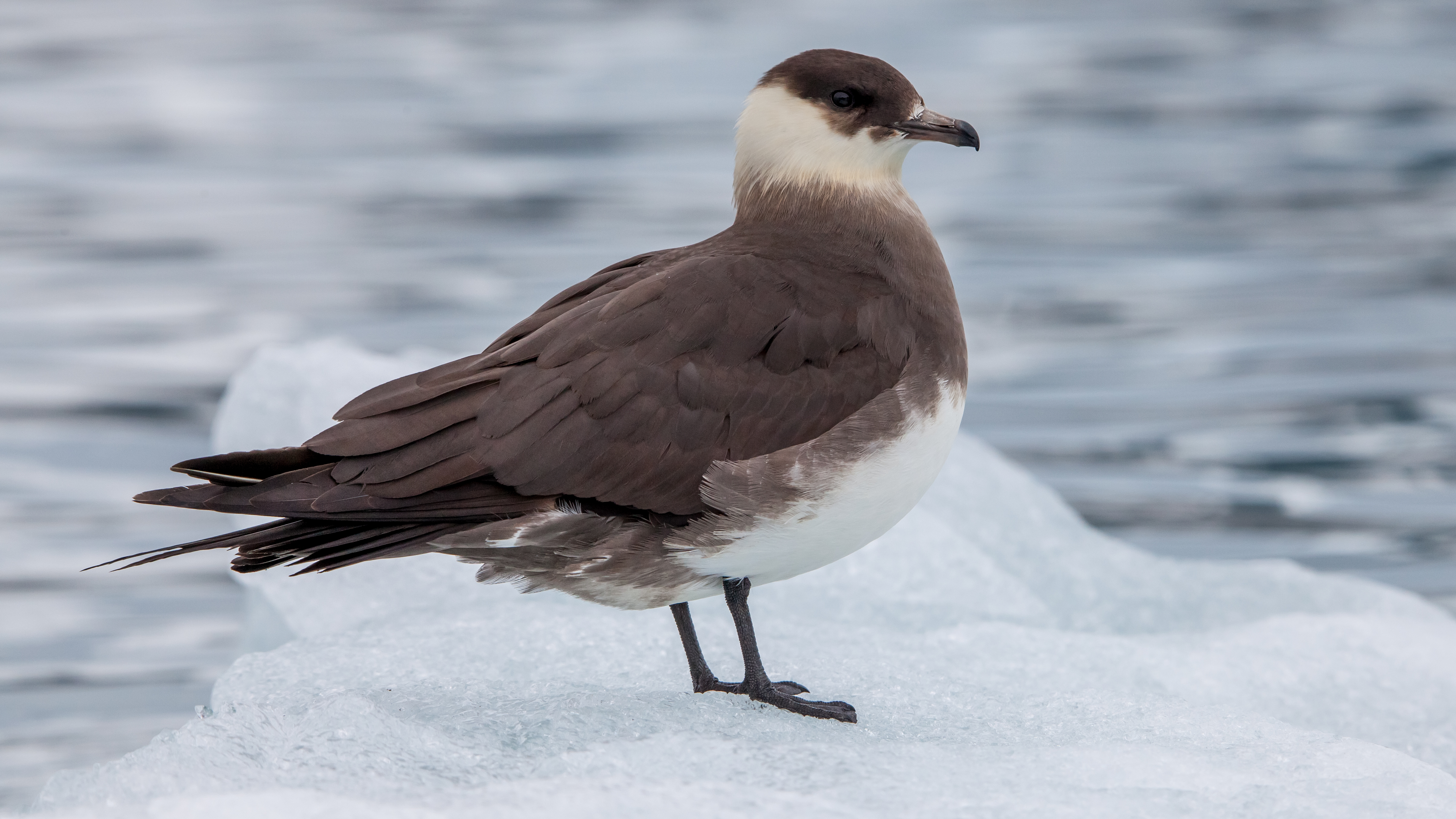
Parasitic jaeger

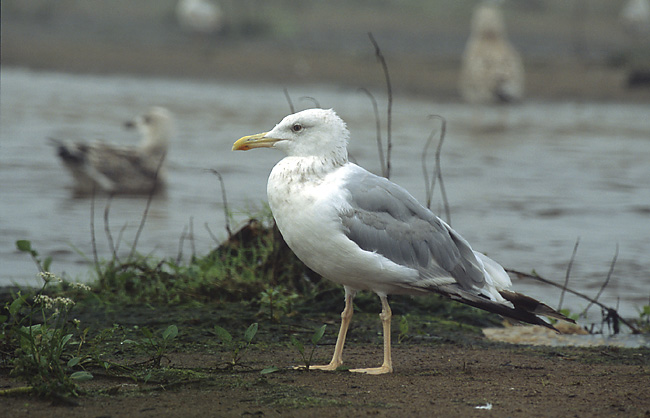
Caspian gull

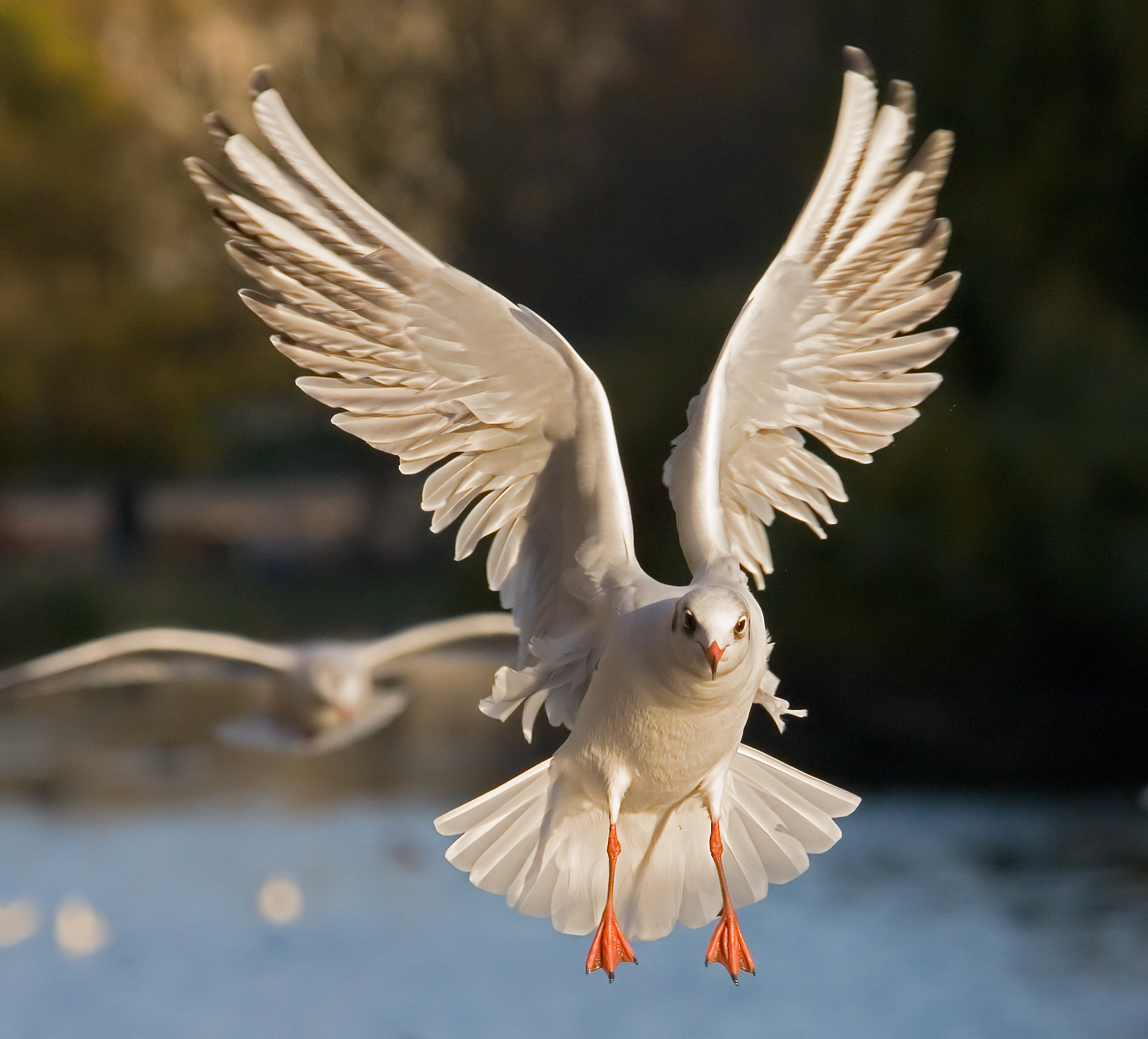
Black headed gull

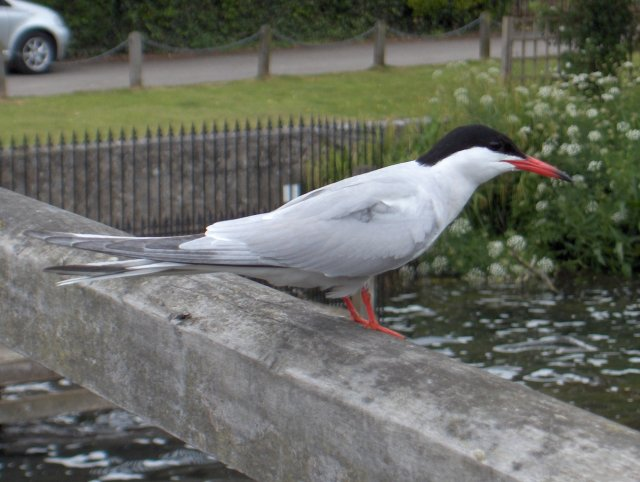
Common tern

- Parasitic jaeger, Stercorarius parasiticus
- Black-tailed gull, Larus crassirostris
- Common gull, Larus canus
- Herring gull, Larus argentatus
- Slaty-backed gull, Larus schistisagus
- Caspian gull, Larus cachinnans
- Heuglin's gull, Larus heuglini
- Glaucous-winged gull, Larus glaucescens
- Glaucous gull, Larus hyperboreus
- Iceland gull, Larus glaucoides
- Black-headed gull, Larus ridibundus
- Saunders's gull, Larus saundersi
- Relict gull, Larus relictus
- Sabine's gull, Xema sabini
- Ross's gull, Rhodostethia rosea
- Black-legged kittiwake, Rissa tridactyla
- Ivory gull, Pagophila eburnea
- Gull-billed tern, Sterna nilotica
- Great crested tern, Sterna bergii
- Common tern, Sterna hirundo
- Little tern, Sterna albifrons
- Sooty tern, Sterna fuscata
- Whiskered tern, Chlidonias hybridus
- White-winged tern, Chlidonias leucopterus

== Auks ==
Order: Charadriiformes Family: Alcidae

An auk is a bird of the family Alcidae in the order Charadriiformes. Auks are superficially similar to penguins due to their black-and-white colours, their upright posture and some of their habits. Nevertheless, they are not closely related to penguins, but rather are believed to be an example of moderate convergent evolution. There are 22 species worldwide, with 8 found in Korea.

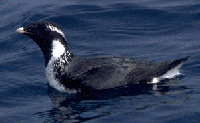
Ancient murrelet

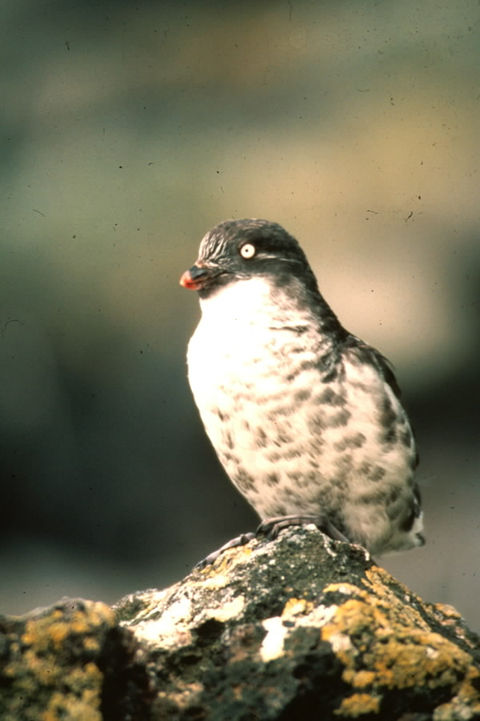
Least auklet

- Common murre, Uria aalge
- Spectacled guillemot, Cepphus carbo
- Ancient murrelet, Synthliboramphus antiquus
- Marbled murrelet, Brachyramphus marmoratus
- Japanese murrelet, Synthliboramphus wumizusume
- Least auklet, Aethia pusilla
- Rhinoceros auklet, Cerorhinca monocerata

== Sandgrouse ==
Order: Pterocliformes Family: Pteroclidae

Sandgrouse have small, pigeon like heads and necks, but sturdy compact bodies. They have long pointed wings and sometimes tails and a fast direct flight. Flocks fly to watering holes at dawn and dusk. They are restricted to treeless open country in the Old World, such as plains and semi-deserts. Legs are feathered down to the toes, and genus Syrrhaptes has the toes feathered as well. There are 16 species worldwide, with one species in Korea.

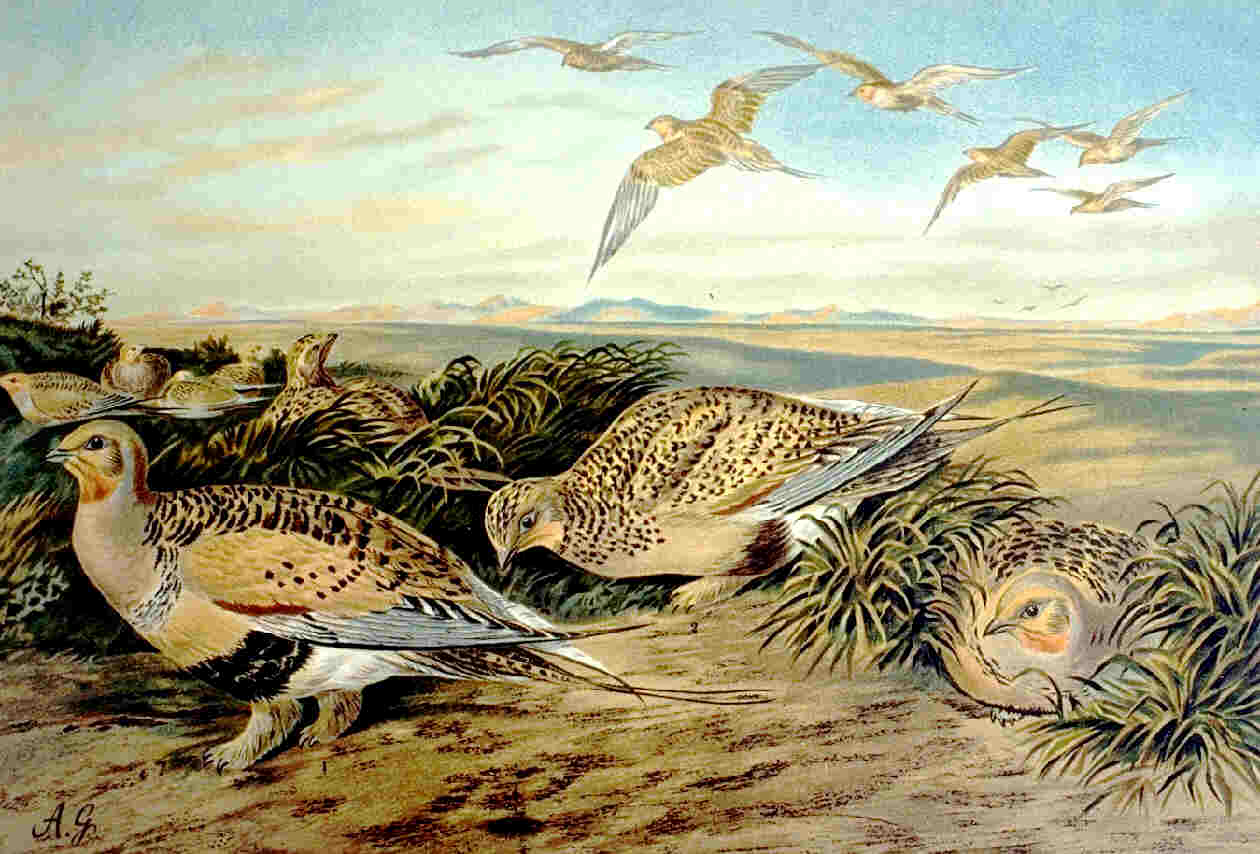
Pallas's sandgrouse

- Pallas's sandgrouse, Syrrhaptes paradoxus

== Pigeons and doves ==
Order: Columbiformes Family: Columbidae

Pigeons and doves are stout-bodied birds with short necks and short slender bills with a fleshy cere. There are 308 species worldwide and 7 Korean species.

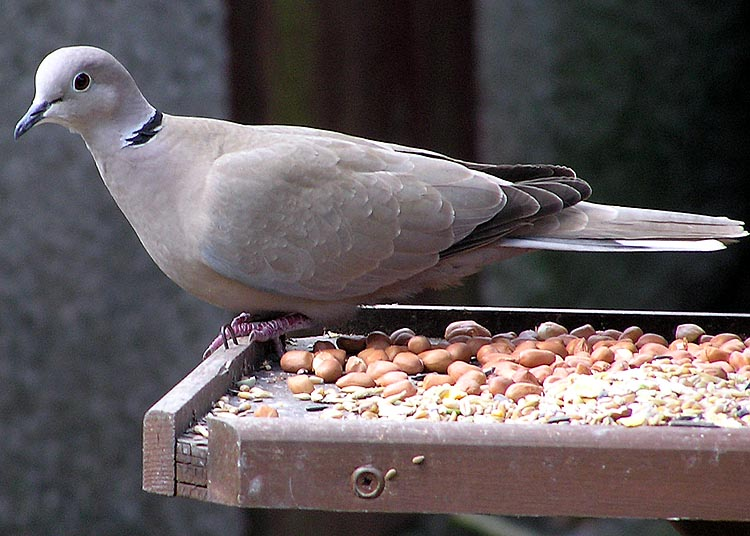
Eurasian collared dove

- Hill pigeon, Columba rupestris
- Japanese wood-pigeon, Columba janthina
- Stock pigeon, Columba oenas
- Oriental turtle dove, Streptopelia orientalis
- Red collared-dove, Streptopelia tranquebarica
- Eurasian collared dove, Streptopelia decaocto
- White-bellied green pigeon, Treron sieboldii

== Cuckoos ==
Order: Cuculiformes Family: Cuculidae

The cuckoos are generally medium-sized slender birds. The majority are arboreal, with a sizeable minority that are terrestrial. The family has a cosmopolitan distribution, with the majority of species being tropical. The temperate species are migratory. The cuckoos feed on insects, insect larvae and a variety of other animals, as well as fruit. Many species are brood parasites, laying their eggs in the nests of other species, but the majority of species raise their own young.

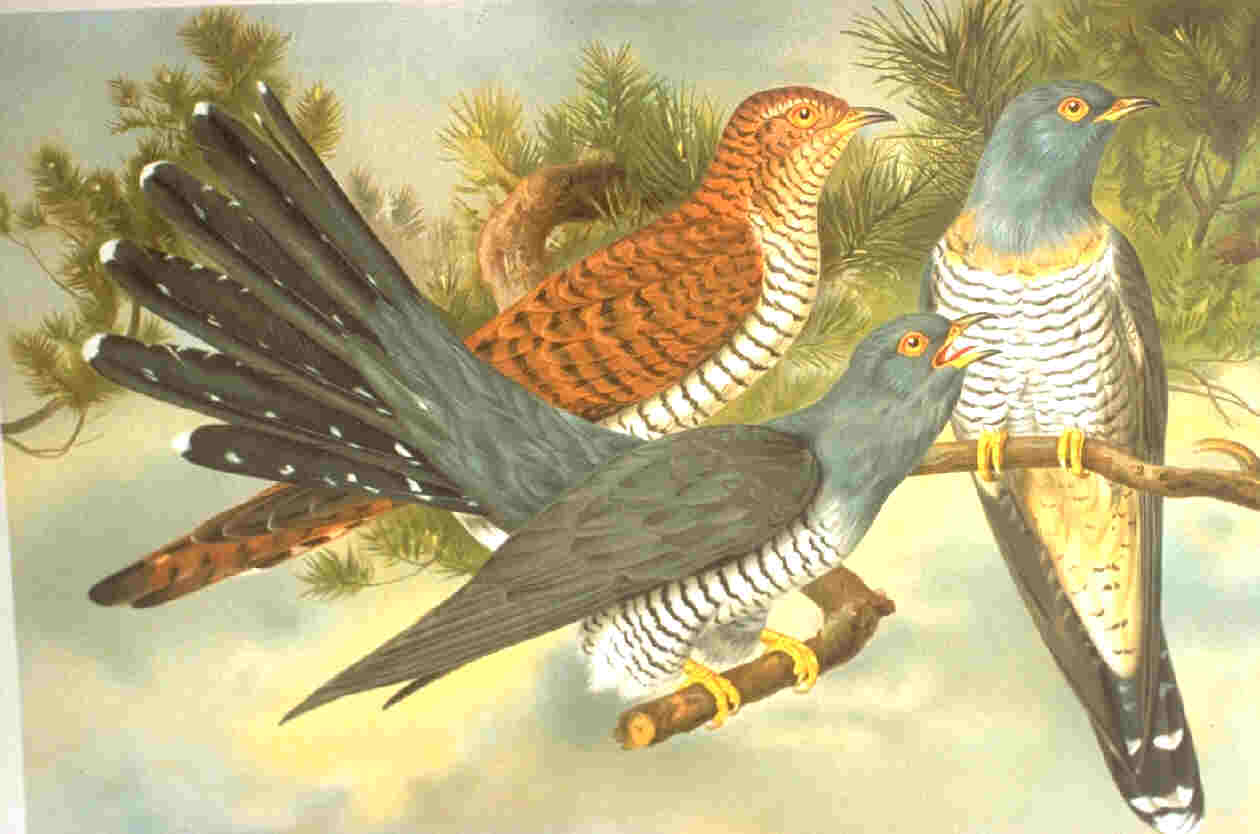
Common cuckoo

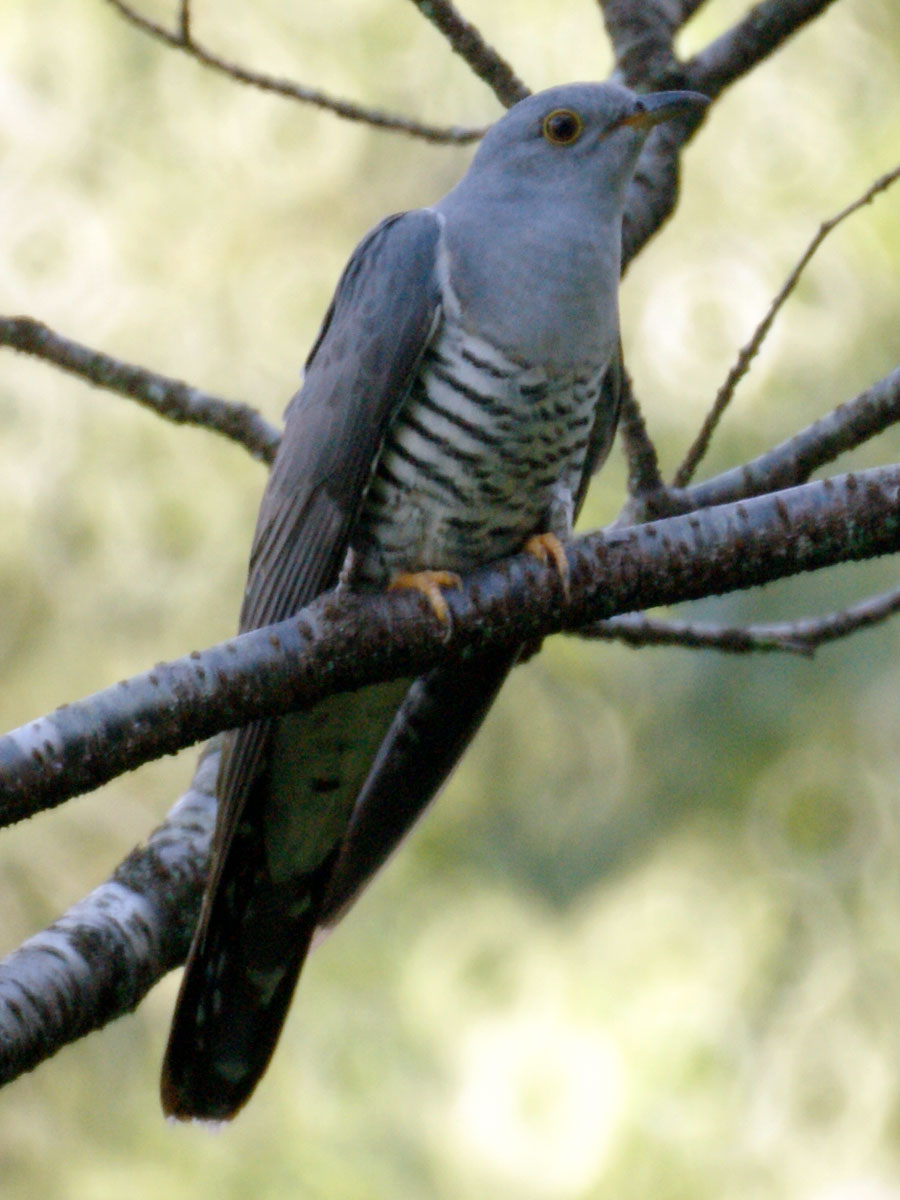
Oriental cuckoo

- Hodgson's hawk-cuckoo, Cuculus fugax
- Indian cuckoo, Cuculus micropterus
- Common cuckoo, Cuculus canorus
- Oriental cuckoo, Cuculus saturatus
- Lesser cuckoo, Cuculus poliocephalus
- Chestnut-winged cuckoo, Clamator coromandus

== Owls ==
Order: Strigiformes Family: Strigidae

Owls are solitary nocturnal birds of prey. They have large forward-facing eyes and ears, a hawk-like beak and a conspicuous circle of feathers around each eye called a facial disk. 11 Korean species have been recorded.

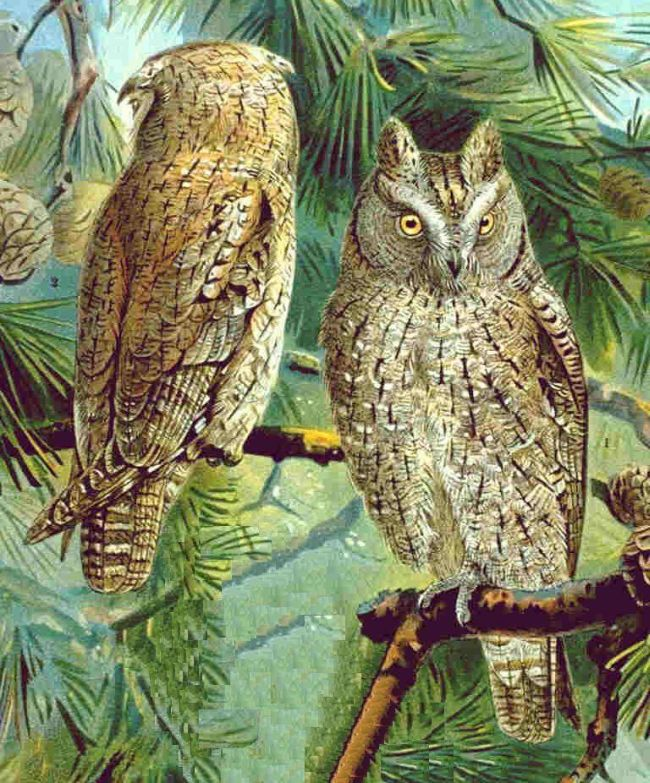
Eurasian scops owl

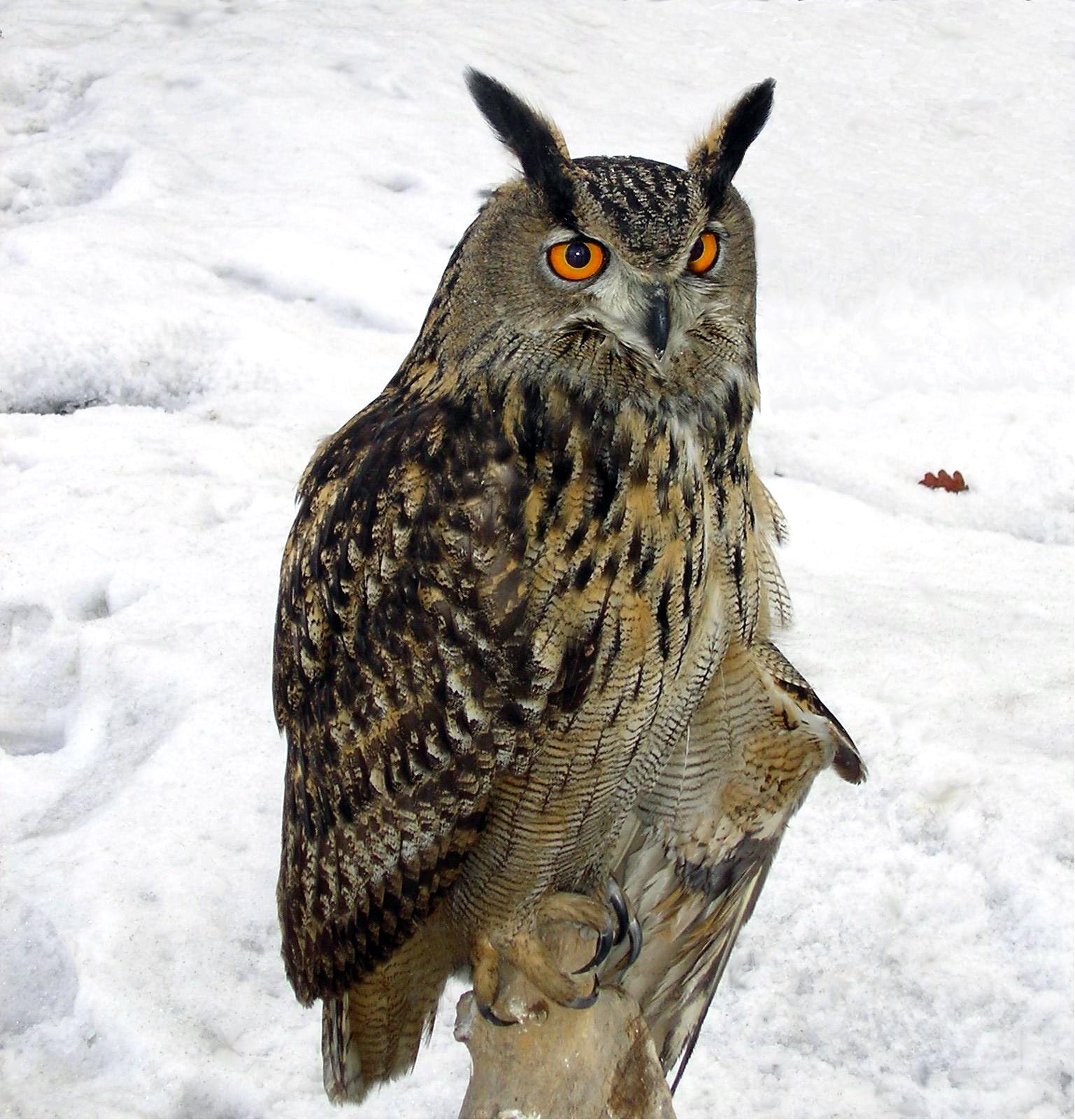
Eurasian eagle owl

- Eurasian scops-owl, Otus scops
- Sunda scops-owl, Otus lempiji
- Eurasian eagle owl, Bubo bubo
- Snowy owl, Nyctea scandiaca
- Himalayan owl, Strix nivicolum
- Ural owl, Strix uralensis
- Northern hawk owl, Surnia ulula
- Little owl, Athene noctua
- Northern boobook, Ninox japonica
- Long-eared owl, Asio otus
- Short-eared owl, Asio flammeus

== Nightjars ==
Order: Caprimulgiformes Family: Caprimulgidae

Nightjars are medium-sized nocturnal birds that usually nest on the ground. They have long wings, short legs and very short bills. Most have small feet, of little use for walking, and long pointed wings. Their soft plumage is cryptically coloured to resemble bark or leaves.

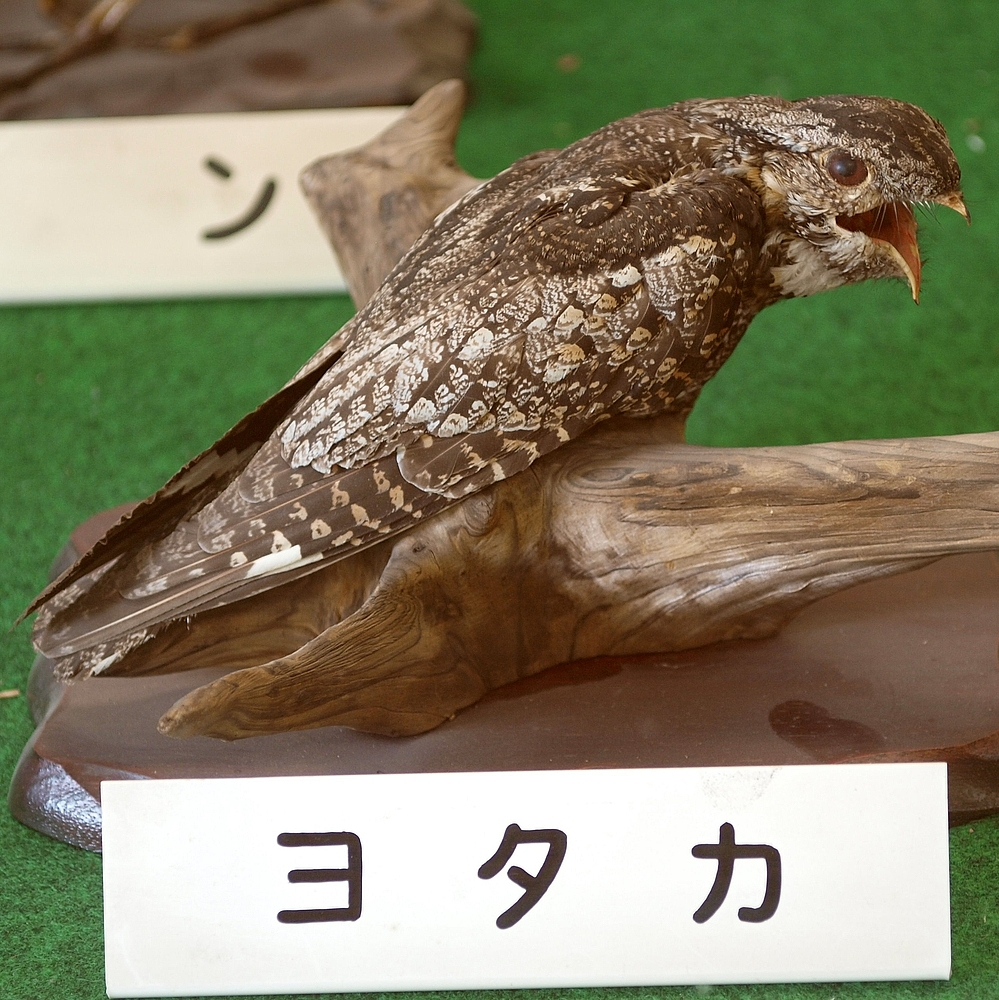
Grey nightjar

- Grey nightjar, Caprimulgus jotaka

== Swifts and needletails ==
Order: Apodiformes Family: Apodidae

The swifts are small birds which spend the majority of their lives flying. These birds have very short legs and never settle voluntarily on the ground, perching instead only on vertical surfaces. Many swifts have long swept-back wings which resemble a crescent or boomerang. There are 3 Korean species.

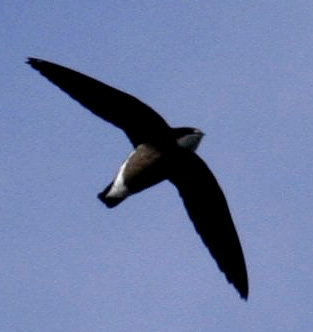
White-throated needletail

- White-throated needletail, Hirundapus caudacutus
- Pacific swift, Apus pacificus
- Little swift, Apus affinis

== Hoopoes ==
Order: Upupiformes Family: Upupidae

There is only one species of hoopoe worldwide. Hoopoes are widespread in Europe, Asia and North Africa, as well as Sub-Saharan Africa and Madagascar. They migrate from all but the southernmost part of their range to the tropics in winter. Their habitat is open cultivated ground with short grass or bare patches. They spend much time on the ground hunting insects and worms.

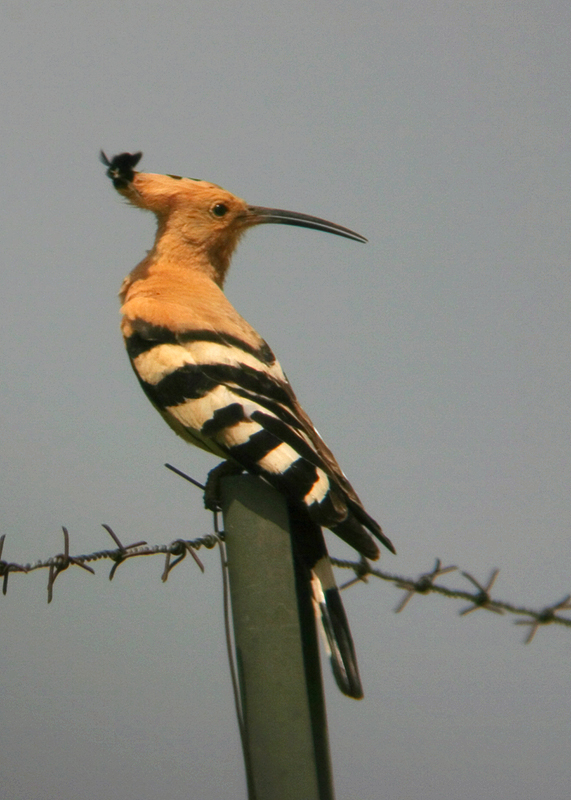
Eurasian hoopoe

- Eurasian hoopoe, Upupa epops

== Rollers ==
Order: Coraciiformes Family: Coraciidae

Rollers are insect eaters, usually catching their prey in the air. They often perch prominently whilst hunting, like giant shrikes. They resemble crows in size and build, but are more closely related to the kingfishers and bee-eaters. They share the colourful appearance of those groups, blues and browns predominating. The two inner front toes are connected, but not the outer one. There are twelve species worldwide, but only one is found in Korea.

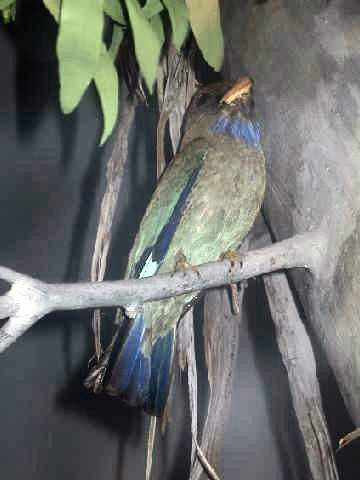
Dollarbird

- Dollarbird, Eurystomus orientalis

== River kingfishers ==
Order: Coraciiformes Family: Alcedinidae

The river kingfishers are one of the three families of bird in the kingfisher group.

Black-capped kingfisher

- Common kingfisher, Alcedo atthis
- Ruddy kingfisher, Halcyon coromanda
- Black-capped kingfisher, Halcyon pileata

== Water kingfishers ==
Order: Coraciiformes Family: Cerylidae

These are all specialist fish-eating species, unlike many representatives of the other two families, and it is likely that they are all descended from fish-eating kingfishers which founded populations in the New World. It was believed that the entire group evolved in the Americas, but this seems not to be true. The original ancestor possibly evolved in Africa - at any rate in the Old World - and the Chloroceryle species are the youngest ones.

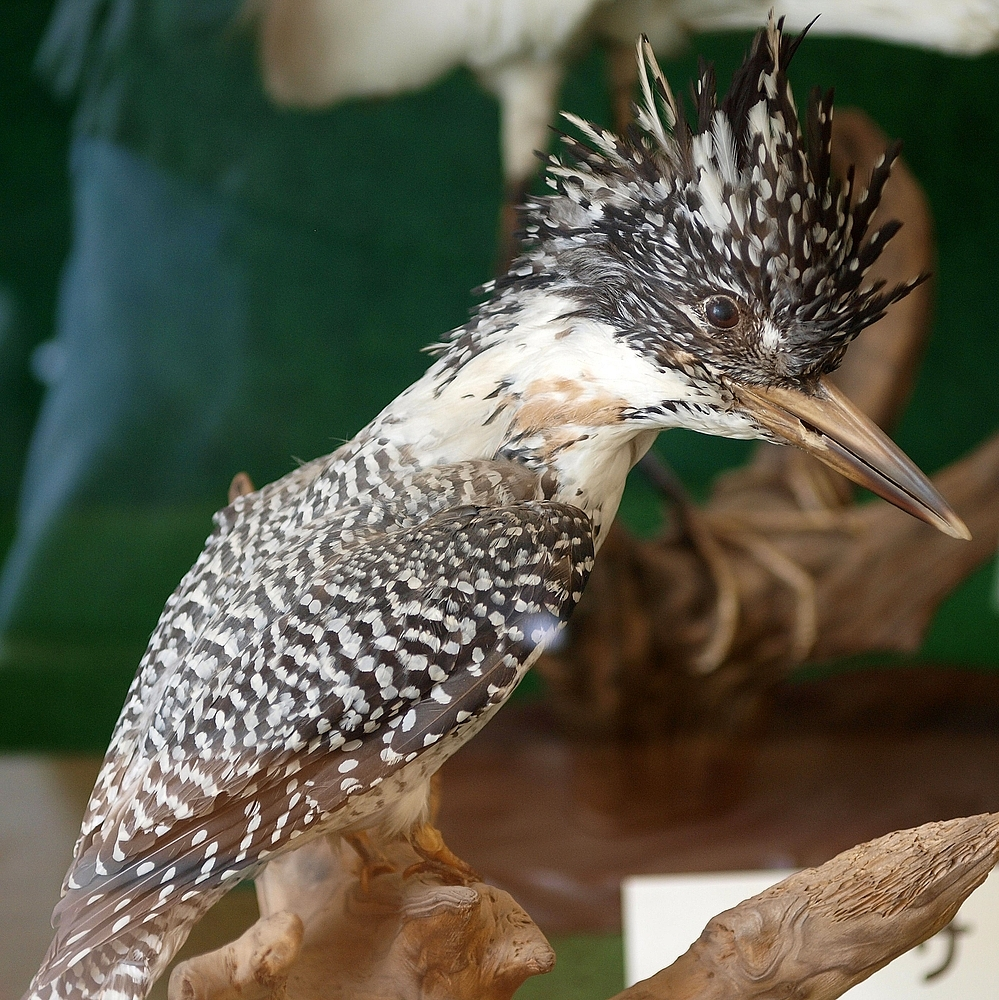
Crested kingfisher

- Crested kingfisher, Megaceryle lugubris

== Woodpeckers ==
Order: Piciformes Family: Picidae

Woodpeckers are small to medium-sized birds with chisel-like beaks, short legs, stiff tails and long tongues used for capturing insects. Some species have feet with two toes pointing forward and two backward, while several species have only three toes. Many woodpeckers have the habit of tapping noisily on tree trunks with their beaks. There are more than 200 species worldwide and 11 species in Korea.

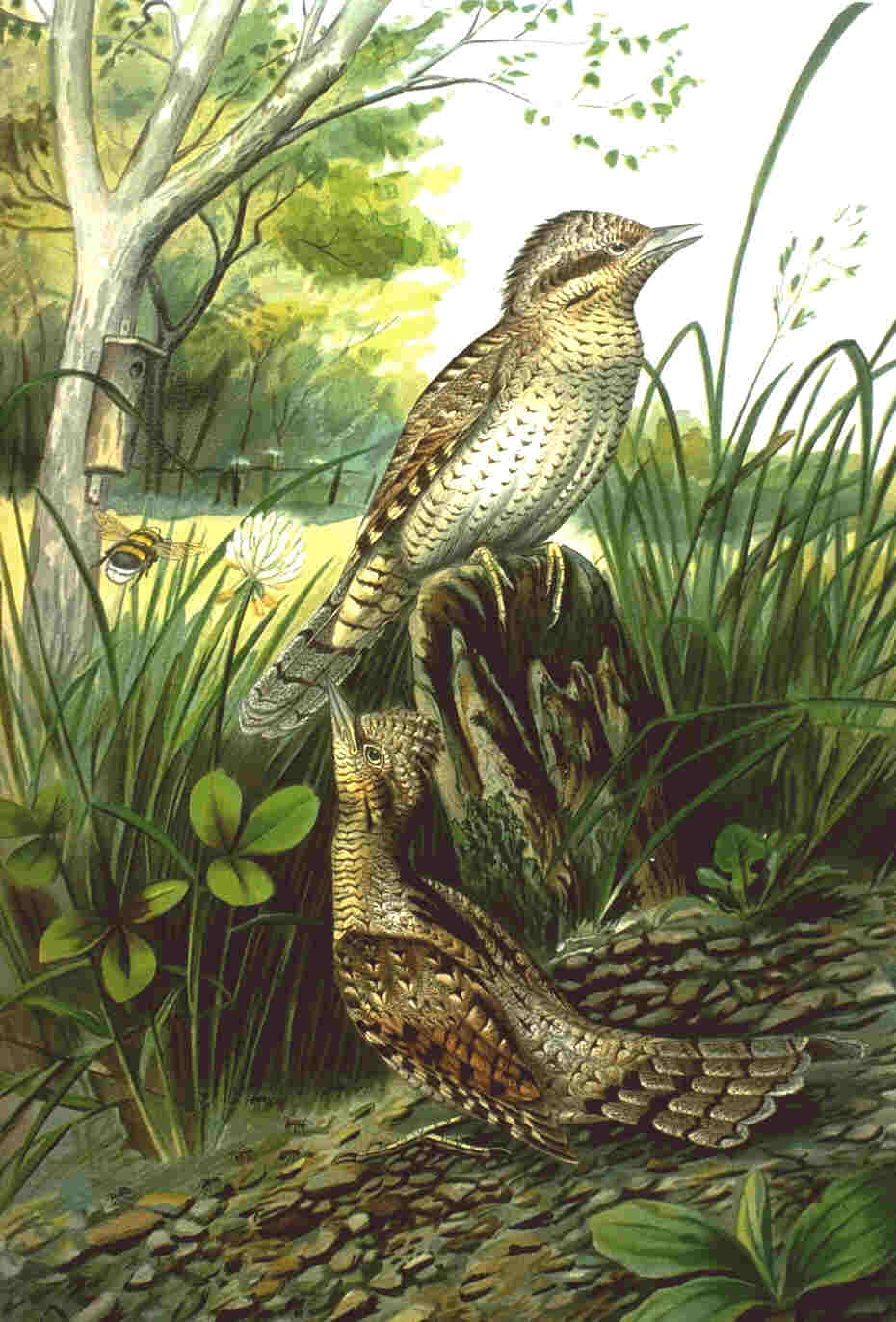
Eurasian wryneck

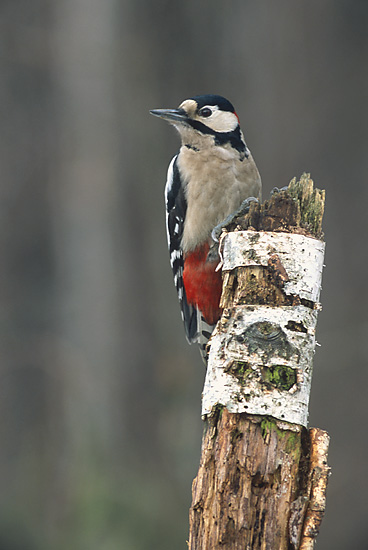
Great spotted woodpecker

- Eurasian wryneck, Jynx torquilla
- Japanese pygmy woodpecker, Dendrocopos kizuki
- Great spotted woodpecker, Dendrocopos major
- Lesser spotted woodpecker, Dendrocopos minor
- White-backed woodpecker, Dendrocopos leucotos
- Rufous-bellied woodpecker, Dendrocopos hyperythrus
- Grey-capped pygmy woodpecker, Dendrocopos canicapillus
- Eurasian three-toed woodpecker, Picoides tridactylus
- Tristram's woodpecker, Dryocopus javensis
- Black woodpecker, Dryocopus martius
- Grey-faced woodpecker, Picus canus

== Passeriformes ==
=== Pittidae ===
- Pitta nympha, fairy pitta

=== Laniidae ===
Common name	Binomial	Preferred habitat	Range	Status
Bull-headed shrike	Lanius bucephalus			
Brown shrike	Lanius cristatus			
Tiger shrike	Lanius tigrinus			
Northern shrike	Lanius excubitor			
Chinese grey shrike	Lanius sphenocercus		Winter migrant.	K: Rare.
Long-tailed shrike	Lanius schach			
Steppe grey shrike	Lanius excubitor pallidirostris		Winter migrant on west coast.	K: Accidental.

=== Campephagidae ===
- Pericrocotus divaricatus, ashy minivet
- Coracina melaschistos, black-winged cuckoo-shrike

=== Monarchidae ===
- Terpsiphone incei, Amur paradise flycatcher
- Terpsiphone atrocaudata, Japanese paradise flycatcher

=== Oriolidae ===
- Oriolus chinensis, black-naped oriole

=== Dicruridae ===
- Dicrurus macrocercus, black drongo
- Dicrurus hottentottus, hair-crested drongo
- Dicrurus leucophaeus, ashy drongo

=== Artamidae ===
- Artamus leucorynchus, white-breasted woodswallow

=== Corvidae ===
- Pica serica, Oriental magpie
- Garrulus glandarius, Eurasian jay
- Cyanopica cyana, azure-winged magpie
- Nucifraga caryocatactes, spotted nutcracker
- Coloeus dauuricus, Daurian jackdaw
- Corvus frugilegus, rook
- Corvus corone, carrion crow
- Corvus macrorhynchos, large-billed crow
- Pyrrhocorax pyrrhocorax, red-billed chough

=== Bombycillidae ===
- Bombycilla garrulus, Bohemian waxwing
- Bombycilla japonica, Japanese waxwing

=== Cinclidae ===
- Cinclus pallasii, brown dipper

=== Turdidae ===
- Monticola gularis, white-throated rock thrush
- Monticola solitarius, blue rock thrush
- Zoothera sibirica, Siberian thrush
- Zoothera dauma, scaly thrush
- Turdus hortulorum, grey-backed thrush
- Turdus cardis, Japanese thrush
- Turdus obscurus, eyebrowed thrush
- Turdus pallidus, pale thrush
- Turdus chrysolaus, brown-headed thrush
- Turdus ruficollis, dark-throated thrush
- Turdus naumanni eunomus, dusky thrush (ssp. in Japan)
- Turdus naumanni naumanni, dusky thrush
- Turdus merula, Eurasian blackbird

=== Muscicapidae ===
- Muscicapa griseisticta, grey-streaked flycatcher
- Muscicapa sibirica, dark-sided flycatcher
- Muscicapa dauurica, Asian brown flycatcher
- Ficedula zanthopygia, yellow-rumped flycatcher
- Ficedula narcissina, Narcissus flycatcher
- Ficedula mugimaki, mugimaki flycatcher
- Ficedula parva, red-breasted flycatcher
- Cyanoptila cyanomelana, blue-and-white flycatcher
- Erithacus akahige, Japanese robin
- Luscinia sibilans, rufous-tailed robin
- Luscinia calliope, Siberian rubythroat
- Luscinia svecica, bluethroat
- Luscinia cyane, Siberian blue robin
- Tarsiger cyanurus, orange-flanked bush-robin
- Phoenicurus ochruros, black redstart
- Phoenicurus auroreus, Daurian redstart
- Saxicola maurus, Siberian stonechat
- Saxicola stejnegeri, Amur stonechat
- Saxicola ferrea, grey bushchat
- Oenanthe pleschanka, pied wheatear

=== Sturnidae ===
- Spodiopsar cineraceus, white-cheeked starling
- Agropsar philippensis, chestnut-cheeked starling
- Agropsar sturninus, Daurian starling
- Sturnia sinensis, white-shouldered starling
- Sturnus vulgaris, common starling

=== Sittidae ===
- Sitta europaea, Eurasian nuthatch
- Sitta villosa, snowy-browed nuthatch

=== Certhiidae ===
- Certhia familiaris, common treecreeper

=== Troglodytidae ===
- Troglodytes troglodytes, Eurasian wren

=== Paridae ===
- Parus minor, Japanese tit
- Parus varius, varied tit
- Parus ater, coal tit
- Parus montanus, willow tit
- Parus palustris, marsh tit

=== Remizidae ===
- Remiz pendulinus, Eurasian penduline tit

=== Panuridae ===
- Panurus biarmicus, bearded reedling

=== Aegithalidae ===
- Aegithalos caudatus, long-tailed tit

=== Hirundinidae ===
- Riparia riparia, sand martin
- Hirundo rustica, barn swallow
- Cecropis daurica, red-rumped swallow
- Delichon urbica, common house martin

=== Regulidae ===
- Regulus regulus, goldcrest

=== Pycnonotidae ===
- Ixos amaurotis, brown-eared bulbul

=== Cisticolidae ===
- Cisticola juncidis, zitting cisticola

=== Zosteropidae ===
- Zosterops erythropleurus, chestnut-flanked white-eye
- Zosterops japonicus, Japanese white-eye

=== Cettiidae ===
- Urosphena squameiceps, Asian stubtail
- Horornis diphone, Japanese bush warbler

=== Locustellidae ===
- Locustella lanceolata, lanceolated warbler
- Helopsaltes certhiola, Pallas's grasshopper warbler
- Helopsaltes ochotensis, Middendorff's grasshopper warbler
- Helopsaltes pleskei, Pleske's grasshopper warbler
- Helopsaltes fasciolatus, Gray's grasshopper warbler
- Helopsaltes pryeri, marsh grassbird

=== Acrocephalidae ===
- Acrocephalus bistrigiceps, black-browed reed warbler
- Acrocephalus arundinaceus, great reed warbler
- Arundinax aedon, thick-billed warbler

=== Phylloscopidae ===
- Phylloscopus fuscatus, dusky warbler
- Phylloscopus schwarzi, Radde's warbler
- Bradypterus thoracicus, spotted bush-warbler
- Phylloscopus proregulus, lemon-rumped warbler
- Phylloscopus inornatus, inornate warbler
- Phylloscopus borealis, Arctic warbler
- Phylloscopus trochiloides, greenish warbler
- Phylloscopus tenellipes, pale-legged leaf warbler
- Phylloscopus occipitalis, western crowned warbler

=== Sylviidae ===
- Paradoxornis webbianus, vinous-throated parrotbill
- Sylvia curruca, lesser whitethroat
- Rhopophilus pekinensis, Beijing babbler

=== Alaudidae ===
- Calandrella cinerea, red-capped lark
- Alaudala cheleensis, Asian short-toed lark
- Galerida cristata, crested lark
- Alauda arvensis, sky lark

=== Passeridae ===
- Passer cinnamomeus, russet sparrow
- Passer montanus, Eurasian tree sparrow
- Dendronanthus indicus, forest wagtail
- Motacilla alba, white wagtail
- Motacilla lugens, black-backed wagtail
- Motacilla grandis, Japanese wagtail
- Motacilla flava, yellow wagtail
- Motacilla cinerea, grey wagtail
- Anthus richardi, Richard's pipit
- Anthus godlewskii, Blyth's pipit
- Anthus hodgsoni, olive-backed pipit
- Anthus gustavi, Pechora pipit
- Anthus cervinus, red-throated pipit
- Anthus roseatus, rosy pipit
- Anthus spinoletta, water pipit
- Prunella collaris, alpine accentor
- Prunella montanella, Siberian accentor

=== Fringillidae ===
- Fringilla montifringilla, brambling
- Chloris sinica, grey-capped greenfinch
- Spinus pinus, pine siskin
- Acanthis hornemanni, hoary redpoll
- Acanthis flammea, common redpoll
- Leucosticte arctoa, Asian rosy finch
- Carpodacus sibiricus, long-tailed rosefinch
- Carpodacus erythrinus, common rosefinch
- Carpodacus roseus, Pallas's rosefinch
- Pinicola enucleator, pine grosbeak
- Loxia curvirostra, red crossbill
- Loxia leucoptera, white-winged crossbill
- Pyrrhula pyrrhula, Eurasian bullfinch
- Coccothraustes coccothraustes, hawfinch
- Eophona migratoria, yellow-billed grosbeak
- Eophona personata, Japanese grosbeak
- Emberiza cioides, meadow bunting
- Emberiza leucocephalos, pine bunting
- Emberiza jankowskii, rufous-backed bunting
- Emberiza tristrami, Tristram's bunting
- Emberiza fucata, chestnut-eared bunting
- Emberiza pusilla, little bunting
- Emberiza chrysophrys, yellow-browed bunting
- Emberiza rustica, rustic bunting
- Emberiza elegans, yellow-throated bunting
- Emberiza aureola, yellow-breasted bunting
- Emberiza rutila, chestnut bunting
- Emberiza sulphurata, yellow bunting
- Emberiza spodocephala, black-faced bunting
- Emberiza variabilis, grey bunting
- Emberiza pallasi, Pallas's bunting
- Emberiza schoeniclus, reed bunting
- Emberiza yessoensis, ochre-rumped bunting
- Emberiza bruniceps, red-headed bunting

=== Calcariidae ===
- Calcarius lapponicus, Lapland longspur
- Plectrophenax nivalis, snow bunting

== See also ==
- List of birds of North Korea
- List of birds of South Korea

== References and further reading ==
- Collinson, Martin. Splitting headaches? Recent taxonomic changes affecting the British and Western Palaearctic lists British Birds vol 99 (June 2006), 306-323
- Jo, Sam-rae (조삼래) (2002). 서산의 새 [Seosanui sae] [English title: Birds of Seosan, Korea]. Gongju, South Korea: Kongju National University Press. ISBN 89-88421-34-5.
- Lee, Woo-Shin; Koo, Tae-Hoe; Park, Jin-Young (2000). A field guide to the birds of Korea. Translated by Allen, Desmond. Seoul: LG Evergreen Foundation. ISBN 89-951415-0-6.
- Moores, Nial; Charlie Moores (2004). "A presumed Steppe Grey Shrike (Lanius pallidirostris) on Socheong Island, S Korea" (PDF). Biological Letters. 41 (2): 163–166. Archived from the original (PDF) on 2011-07-22.
