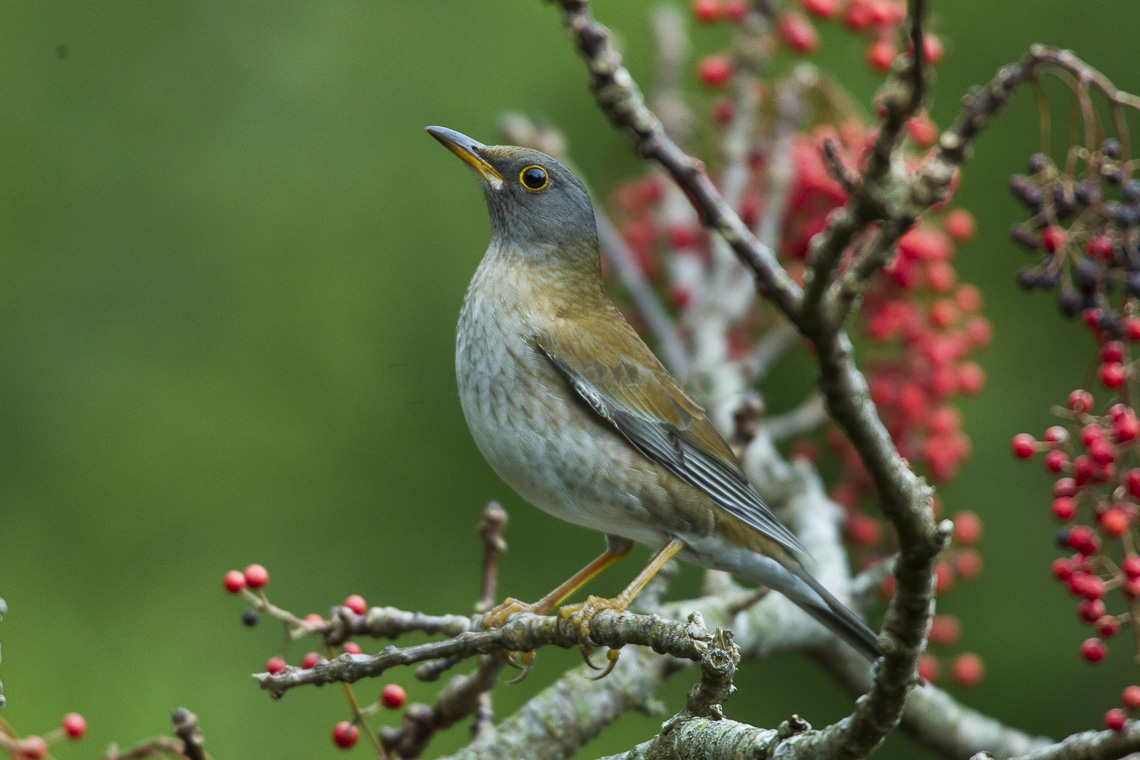

Conservation status
- Least Concern (IUCN 3.1)

Scientific classification
- Kingdom: Animalia
- Phylum: Chordata
- Class: Aves
- Order: Passeriformes
- Family: Turdidae
- Genus: Turdus
- Species: T. pallidus

Binomial name
- Turdus pallidus Gmelin, JF, 1789

= Pale thrush =

Species of bird

The pale thrush (Turdus pallidus) is a passerine bird of the eastern Palearctic belonging to the genus Turdus in the thrush family Turdidae. It is closely related to the eye-browed thrush and grey-backed thrush.

== Taxonomy ==
The pale thrush was formally described in 1789 by the German naturalist Johann Friedrich Gmelin in his revised and expanded edition of Carl Linnaeus's Systema Naturae. He placed it with the thrushes in the genus Turdus and coined the binomial name Turdus pallidus. The scientific name comes from Latin Turdus meaning "thrush" and pallidus meaning "pallid" or "pale". Gmelin based his account on the "Pale thrush" that had been described in 1783 by the English ornithologist John Latham in his multi-volume work A General Synopsis of Birds. The species is monotypic: no subspecies are recognised.

== Description ==
It is 23 cm long. The feet are pale pinkish-brown and the bill is grey above and yellow below. The male is brown above with a blue-grey head and throat. The underparts are pale brown, darker on the flanks and whitish on the belly and undertail-coverts. The flight feathers of the wing are dark grey and the underwing-coverts are grey or white. The tail is dark grey with white tips to the outer feathers. The female is similar to the male but duller with a browner head and pale throat.

It has harsh chuck-chuck and see-ip calls and a bubbling alarm call.

== Distribution and habitat ==
It breeds in south-east Siberia, north-east China and Korea and may breed in Japan, especially on Tsushima Island. It is largely migratory, wintering in southern and central Japan, South Korea and southern China, occasionally reaching as far as Yunnan, Taiwan and the Philippines. It inhabits forests, scrub, gardens and parks. It is a shy bird which keeps to cover. It can occur in large flocks on migration, particularly where there are berries.
