= Grey-backed thrush =

Conservation status
- Least Concern (IUCN 3.1)

Scientific classification
- Kingdom: Animalia
- Phylum: Chordata
- Class: Aves
- Order: Passeriformes
- Family: Turdidae
- Genus: Turdus
- Species: T. hortulorum

Binomial name
- Turdus hortulorum Sclater, PL, 1863

Species of bird

The grey-backed thrush (Turdus hortulorum) is a species of bird in the family Turdidae. It breeds in northeastern China, the Russian Far East and North Korea, and winters mainly in southern China and northern Vietnam. The species inhabits temperate forests and wooded habitats and is migratory.

== Description ==
The grey-backed thrush is a medium-sized passerine measuring approximately 20 to 23 cm (7.9 to 9.1 in) in length. It is sexually dimorphic. Males have slate-grey upperparts and breast, a whitish chin and belly, and rufous-orange flanks. Females have greyer or browner upperparts, with dark spotting on the breast and similar rufous coloration on the flanks.

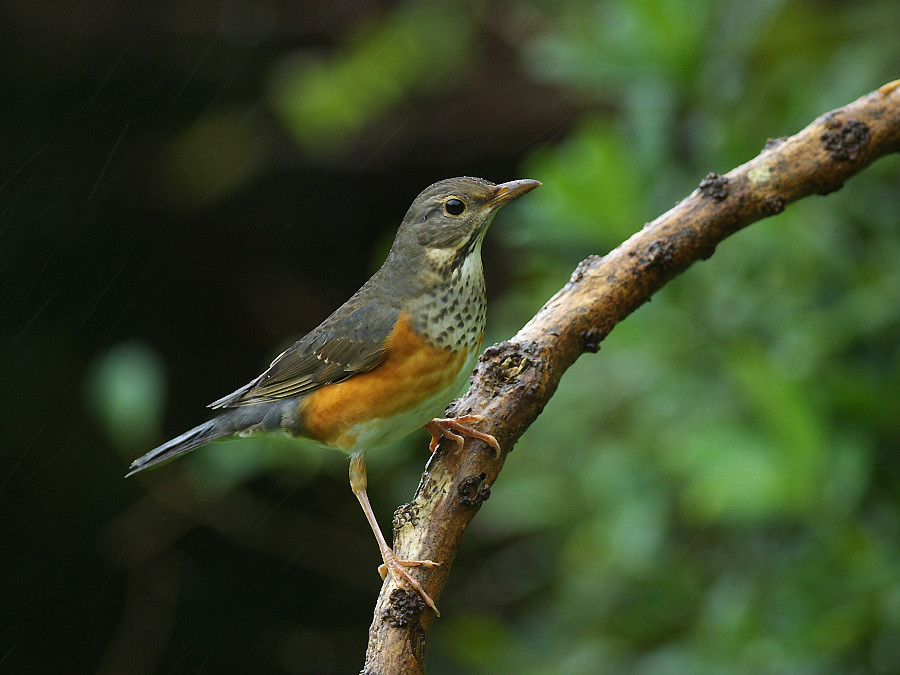
female bird

The mean recorded body mass is 66.7 g (2.35 oz), with recorded individuals ranging from 61 to 69 g.

== Distribution and habitat ==
The grey-backed thrush is monotypic. It breeds in southeastern Siberia, northeastern China and North Korea. In China, its breeding range is concentrated in the northeast, while wintering birds occur mainly south of the Yangtze River. It also winters in northern Vietnam.

During the breeding season, the species inhabits deciduous and mixed forests, often in hilly terrain. A study of 79 nests in Jilin Province, northeastern China, found that nest placement and surrounding vegetation influenced breeding success. In winter it also occurs in more open woodland, bamboo and scrub habitats.

== Behaviour and ecology ==
The grey-backed thrush forages on the ground, including in leaf litter along forest paths. Its diet includes both invertebrates and fruit.

A study of breeding grey-backed thrushes in northeastern China monitored 79 nests during the 2008 breeding season. Of these, 29 were successful, while predation accounted for most nest failures. Another experimental study found that grey-backed thrushes rejected all 12 experimentally introduced foreign eggs, indicating a strong egg-recognition response.

Captive breeding observations have recorded a clutch of five eggs, with hatching occurring 14 days after the first egg was laid and fledging 12 days later.

== Conservation ==
The grey-backed thrush is classified as Least Concern by the International Union for Conservation of Nature. Its population trend is currently considered unknown.
