= List of amphibians of Hong Kong =

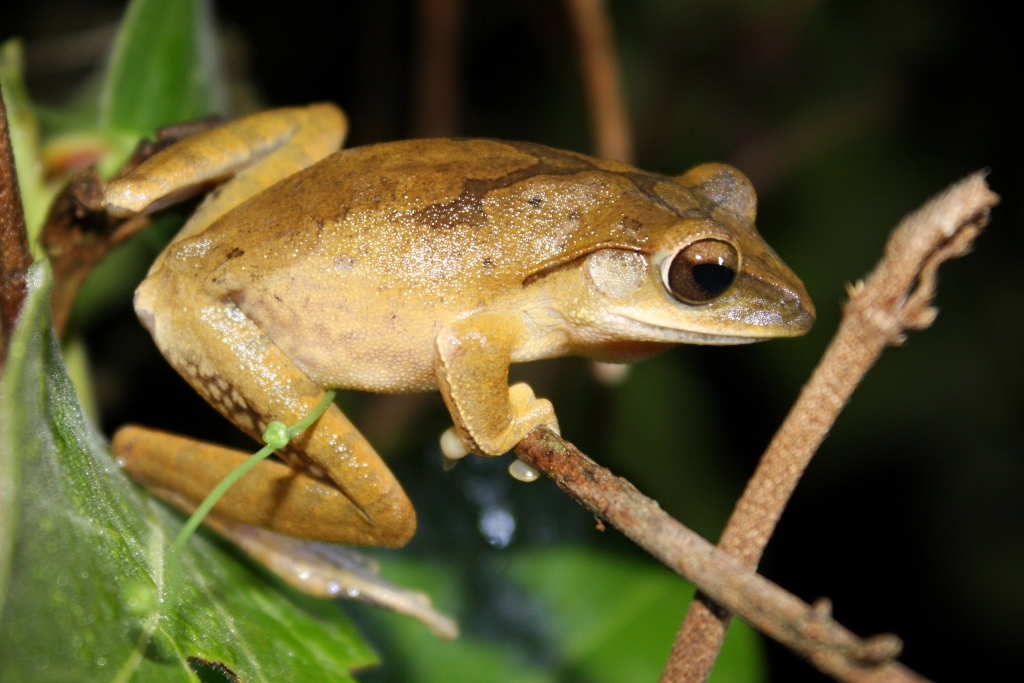
Brown tree frog (Polypedates megacephalus), a common amphibian species in Hong Kong.

There are 24 species of amphibians in Hong Kong, with one species thought to be locally extinct. There is one amphibian species, Liuixalus romeri, endemic to Hong Kong. Amphibian fauna of Hong Kong fauna does not include any caecilians.

The most common amphibians one is likely to encounter are the Asian common toad, brown tree frog and banded bullfrog.

== List of amphibians ==
=== Order Caudata ===
==== Family Salamandridae (salamanders) ====
===== Subfamily Pleurodelinae (newts) =====
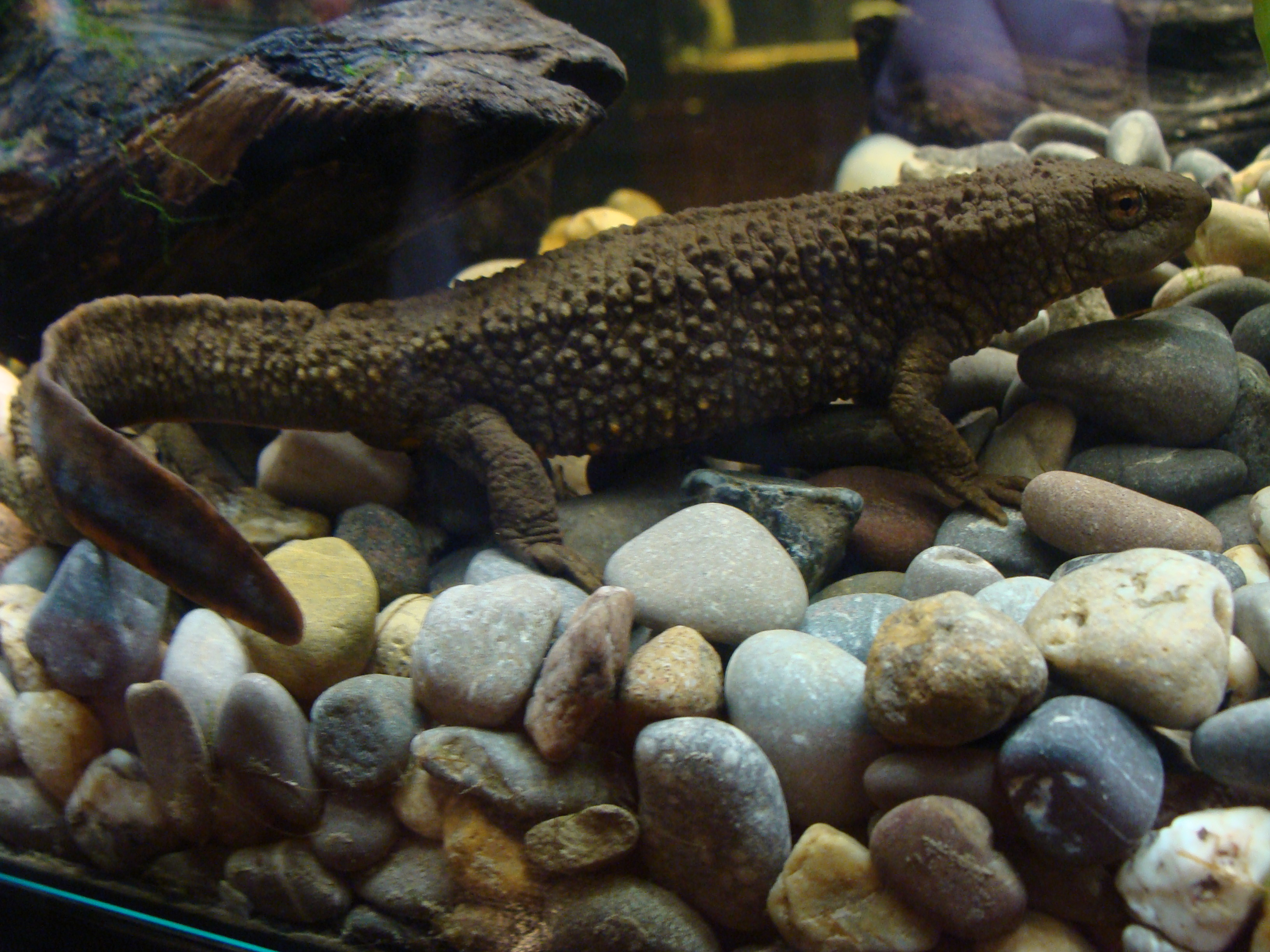
Hong Kong warty newt (Paramesotriton hongkongensis), the only tailed amphibian species in Hong Kong

- Hong Kong warty newt (Paramesotriton hongkongensis) - once believed to be endemic species in Hong Kong, but was found to also occur in Guangdong Province.

=== Order Anura (frogs and toads) ===
==== Family Bufonidae (toads) ====
- Asian common toad (Duttaphrynus melanostictus) - most widespread of the Hong Kong amphibians

==== Family Megophryidae (litter frogs) ====
- Leaf-litter toad (Leptolalax laui)
- Short-legged toad (Megophrys brachykolos)

==== Family Dicroglossidae (fork-tongued frogs) ====
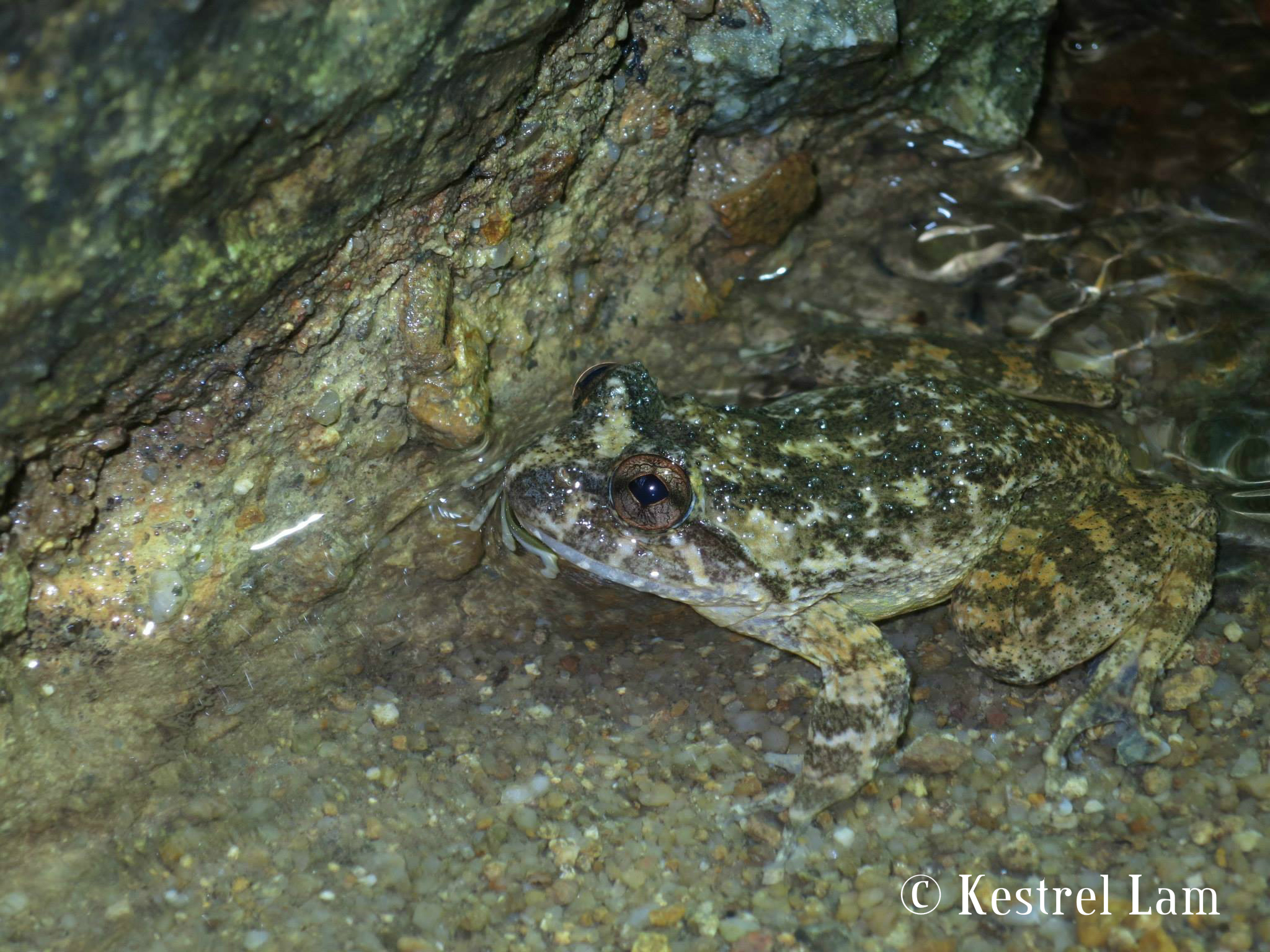
Lesser spiny frog, listed as vulnerable in the IUCN Red List.

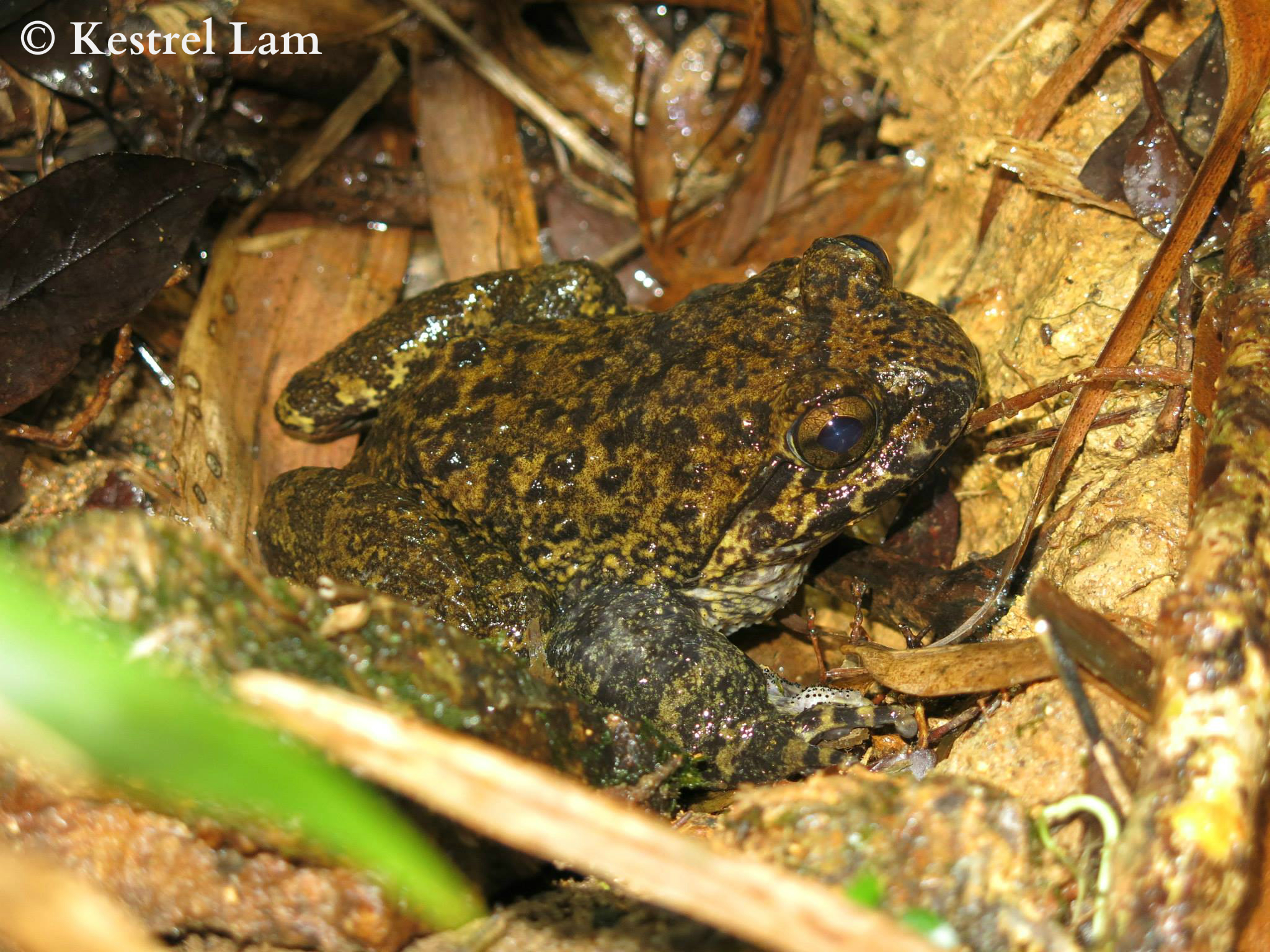
Giant spiny frog (Quasipaa spinosa) from Hong Kong

- Paddy frog (Fejervarya limnocharis)
- Chinese bullfrog (Hoplobatrachus chinensis) - sold as edible frog in Hong Kong and China.
- Big-headed frog (Limnonectes fujianensis)
- Rough-skinned floating frog (Occidozyga lima) - locally extinct in Hong Kong, with plans to reintroduce the same species from Hainan, China.
- Giant spiny frog (Quasipaa spinosa) - potentially sold as edible frog in mainland China
- Lesser spiny frog (Quasipaa exilispinosa)

==== Family Ranidae (True frogs) ====
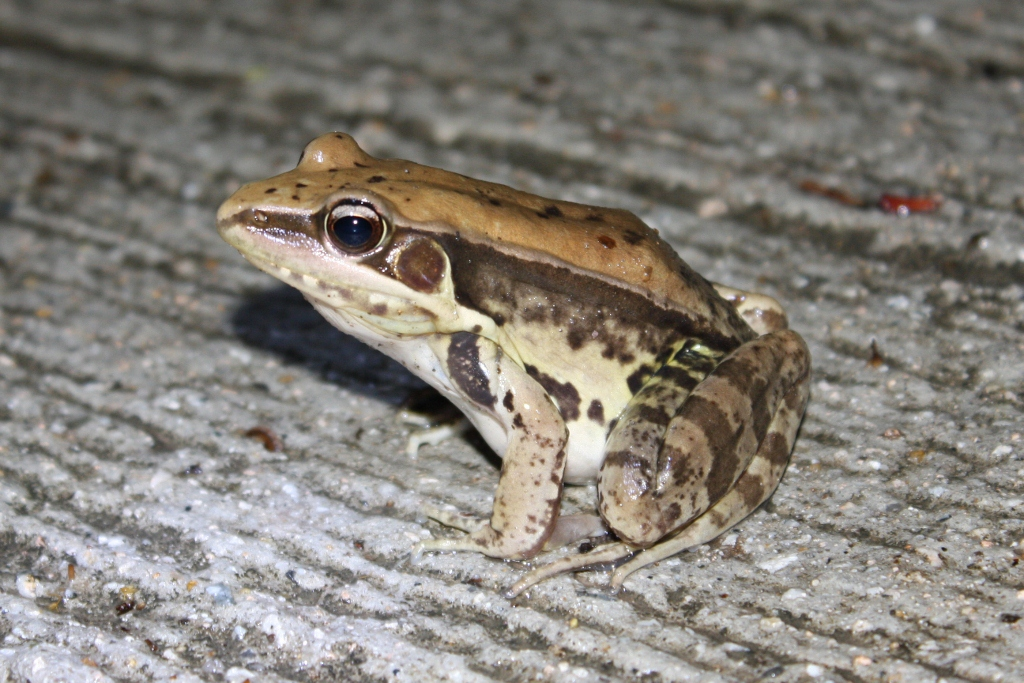
Adult brown wood frog (Sylvirana guentheri) in Sai Kung East Country Park, Hong Kong

- Hong Kong cascade frog (Amolops hongkongensis) - once believed to be an endemic species of Hong Kong, but found to occur in Daya Bay, Guangdong.
- South China cascade frog (Amolops ricketti)
- Günther's frog (Sylvirana guentheri)
- Brown wood frog ("Hylarana" latouchii)
- Green cascade frog (Odorrana chloronota)
- Three-striped grass frog (Hylarana macrodactyla)
- Two-striped grass frog (Hylarana taipehensis)

==== Family Rhacophoridae (gliding frogs) ====
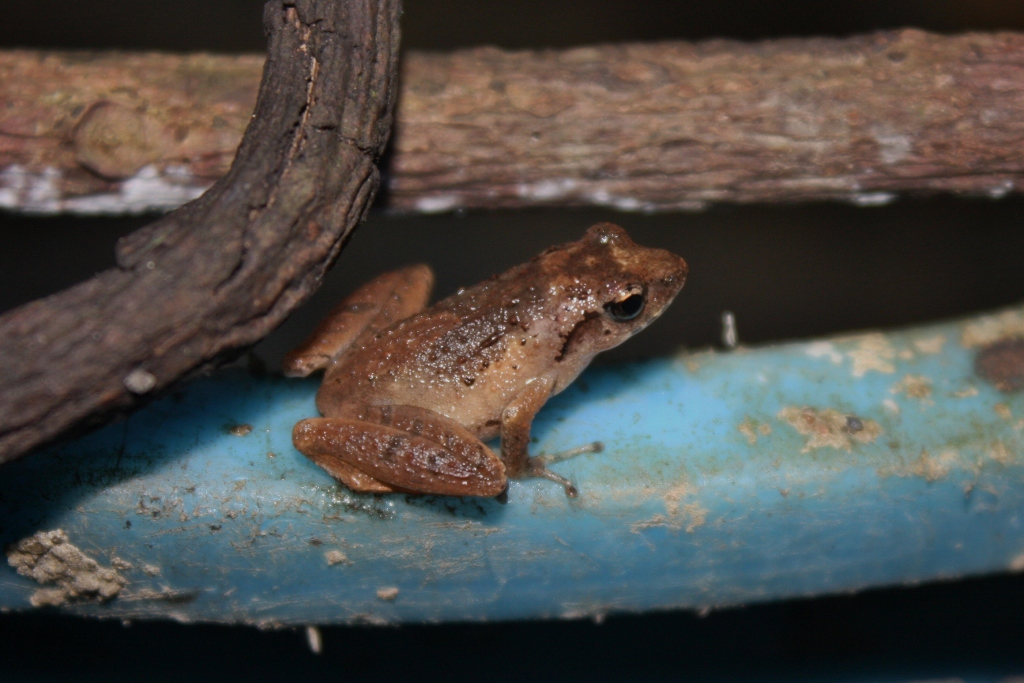
Romer's tree frog (Chirixalus romeri), endemic species in Hong Kong

- Romer's tree frog (Liuixalus romeri) - endemic to Hong Kong.
  - This species was considered as Philautus romeri. A study to review the 177 nominal species in the genus Philautus moved Romer's tree frog from the genus Philautus to Chirixalus since species in Philautus do not have a free-living tadpoles stage. (Banks et al., 2008; Bossuyt & Dubois, 2001)
- Brown tree frog (Polypedates megacephalus)

==== Family Microhylidae (narrow-mouthed frogs) ====
- Spotted narrow-mouthed frog (Kalophrynus interlineatus)
- Banded bullfrog (Kaloula pulchra pulchra)
- Butler's pigmy frog (Microhyla butleri)
- Ornate pigmy frog (Microhyla fissipes)
  - This species has recently undergone genetic boundary divisions and definition changes. Previously Microhyla ornata was listed as occurring in Hong Kong, but now this species is listed as restricted to the Indian subcontinent and Microhyla fissipes is the Southeast Asia and Chinese species. Most online data still report Microhyla ornata for Hong Kong.
- Marbled pigmy frog (Microhyla pulchra)

== Threats to Hong Kong amphibians ==
Despite their semi-terrestrial mode of life, amphibians must breed in water. Rapid development in Hong Kong has resulted in the loss of many low-lying wetlands which were once important habitats; this has led to a severe decline in the populations of certain lowland species, such as the rough-skinned floating frog (Occidozyga lima), which inhabited the once-abundant, but no longer existing paddy fields in Tung Chung. It is now thought to be locally extinct.

Pollution of water bodies and acid rain also affect species's survival. In general, the diversity of amphibians decreases as the water pollution increases. Only some hardier, pollution-tolerant species, such as Günther's frog and the Asian common toad, can thrive in polluted habitats.

Some exotic/market amphibian species are occasionally seen in the countryside, such as the American bullfrog. Some are deliberately released during Buddhist ceremonies. These released animals can adversely affect the local ecosystem and native fauna, as they may prey on, compete with, or spread disease to the native amphibian fauna.

== See also ==
- List of birds of Hong Kong
- Conservation in Hong Kong
- Environment of Hong Kong
