= Environment of Hong Kong =

Overview of the environment in Hong Kong

The environment of Hong Kong features a subtropical climate with temperate conditions for about half of the year as well as a monsoon season. Despite being very densely populated, Hong Kong has a high level of biodiversity. Some threats to the environment include climate change, rising sea levels, pollution, and land development.

== Climate ==
Hong Kong has a subtropical climate with temperate conditions for about six months of the year. The monsoon season lasts from April to September with July to September being the most likely months for tropical cyclones to occur. During the hot, humid summers, the average daily maximum temperatures range from 26 °C at night to 31 °C during the day, with late May to mid-September seeing the highest temperatures. Hong Kong receives between 1,400 and 3,000 millimetres of rain per year and 80% of that occurs from May to September. Of these, June and August are the wettest months, with rain falling on almost four out of seven days. The winters are dry and temperate. December and January, are the driest months, with an average of only one rainy day per week.

Climate data for Hong Kong (Hong Kong Observatory), normals 1991–2020, (Note: Mean monthly maxima and minima (i.e., the expected highest and lowest temperature readings at any point during the year or given month) calculated based on data in Hong Kong from 1991 to 2020.) extremes 1884–1939 and 1947–present
Month	Jan	Feb	Mar	Apr	May	Jun	Jul	Aug	Sep	Oct	Nov	Dec	Year
Record high °C (°F)	26.9 (80.4)	28.3 (82.9)	31.5 (88.7)	33.4 (92.1)	36.1 (97.0)	35.6 (96.1)	36.1 (97.0)	36.6 (97.9)	35.9 (96.6)	34.6 (94.3)	31.8 (89.2)	28.7 (83.7)	36.6 (97.9)
Mean maximum °C (°F)	24.0 (75.2)	25.1 (77.2)	27.5 (81.5)	30.2 (86.4)	32.3 (90.1)	33.6 (92.5)	34.1 (93.4)	34.2 (93.6)	33.4 (92.1)	31.3 (88.3)	28.4 (83.1)	25.1 (77.2)	34.7 (94.5)
Mean daily maximum °C (°F)	18.7 (65.7)	19.4 (66.9)	21.9 (71.4)	25.6 (78.1)	28.8 (83.8)	30.7 (87.3)	31.6 (88.9)	31.3 (88.3)	30.5 (86.9)	28.1 (82.6)	24.5 (76.1)	20.4 (68.7)	26.0 (78.8)
Daily mean °C (°F)	16.5 (61.7)	17.1 (62.8)	19.5 (67.1)	23.0 (73.4)	26.3 (79.3)	28.3 (82.9)	28.9 (84.0)	28.7 (83.7)	27.9 (82.2)	25.7 (78.3)	22.2 (72.0)	18.2 (64.8)	23.5 (74.3)
Mean daily minimum °C (°F)	14.6 (58.3)	15.3 (59.5)	17.6 (63.7)	21.1 (70.0)	24.5 (76.1)	26.5 (79.7)	26.9 (80.4)	26.7 (80.1)	26.1 (79.0)	23.9 (75.0)	20.3 (68.5)	16.2 (61.2)	21.6 (70.9)
Mean minimum °C (°F)	9.1 (48.4)	10.2 (50.4)	12.2 (54.0)	16.3 (61.3)	20.7 (69.3)	23.6 (74.5)	24.2 (75.6)	24.3 (75.7)	23.5 (74.3)	20.1 (68.2)	15.3 (59.5)	10.1 (50.2)	7.8 (46.0)
Record low °C (°F)	0.0 (32.0)	2.4 (36.3)	4.8 (40.6)	9.9 (49.8)	15.4 (59.7)	19.2 (66.6)	21.7 (71.1)	21.6 (70.9)	18.4 (65.1)	13.5 (56.3)	6.5 (43.7)	4.3 (39.7)	0.0 (32.0)
Average rainfall mm (inches)	33.2 (1.31)	38.9 (1.53)	75.3 (2.96)	153.0 (6.02)	290.6 (11.44)	491.5 (19.35)	385.8 (15.19)	453.2 (17.84)	321.4 (12.65)	120.3 (4.74)	39.3 (1.55)	28.8 (1.13)	2,431.2 (95.72)
Average rainy days (≥ 0.1 mm)	5.70	7.97	10.50	11.37	15.37	19.33	18.43	17.50	14.90	7.83	5.70	5.30	139.90
Average relative humidity (%)	74	79	82	83	83	82	81	81	78	73	72	70	78
Average dew point °C (°F)	11.7 (53.1)	13.2 (55.8)	16.1 (61.0)	19.7 (67.5)	23.0 (73.4)	24.9 (76.8)	25.2 (77.4)	25.1 (77.2)	23.6 (74.5)	20.2 (68.4)	16.7 (62.1)	12.4 (54.3)	19.3 (66.7)
Mean monthly sunshine hours	145.8	101.7	100.0	113.2	138.8	144.3	197.3	182.1	174.4	197.8	172.3	161.6	1,829.3
Percentage possible sunshine	43	32	27	30	34	36	48	46	47	55	52	48	41
Source: Hong Kong Observatory

Hong Kong SAR, China

Climate chart (precipitation, max. and min. temperature)
J	F	M	A	M	J	J	A	S	O	N	D
33 19 15	39 19 15	75 22 18	153 26 21	291 29 25	492 31 27	386 32 27	453 31 27	321 31 26	120 28 24	39 25 20	29 20 16
- █ Average max. and min. temperatures in °C
- █ Precipitation totals in mm
Imperial conversion
J	F	M	A	M	J	J	A	S	O	N	D
1.3 66 58	1.5 67 60	3 71 64	6 78 70	11 84 76	19 87 80	15 89 80	18 88 80	13 87 79	4.7 83 75	1.5 76 69	1.1 69 61
- █ Average max. and min. temperatures in °F
- █ Precipitation totals in inches

== Land ==
The total land area of Hong Kong is 1,108 square kilometres, but about 75% of this land is open countryside and about 40% is designated as country parks.

== Species richness in Hong Kong ==
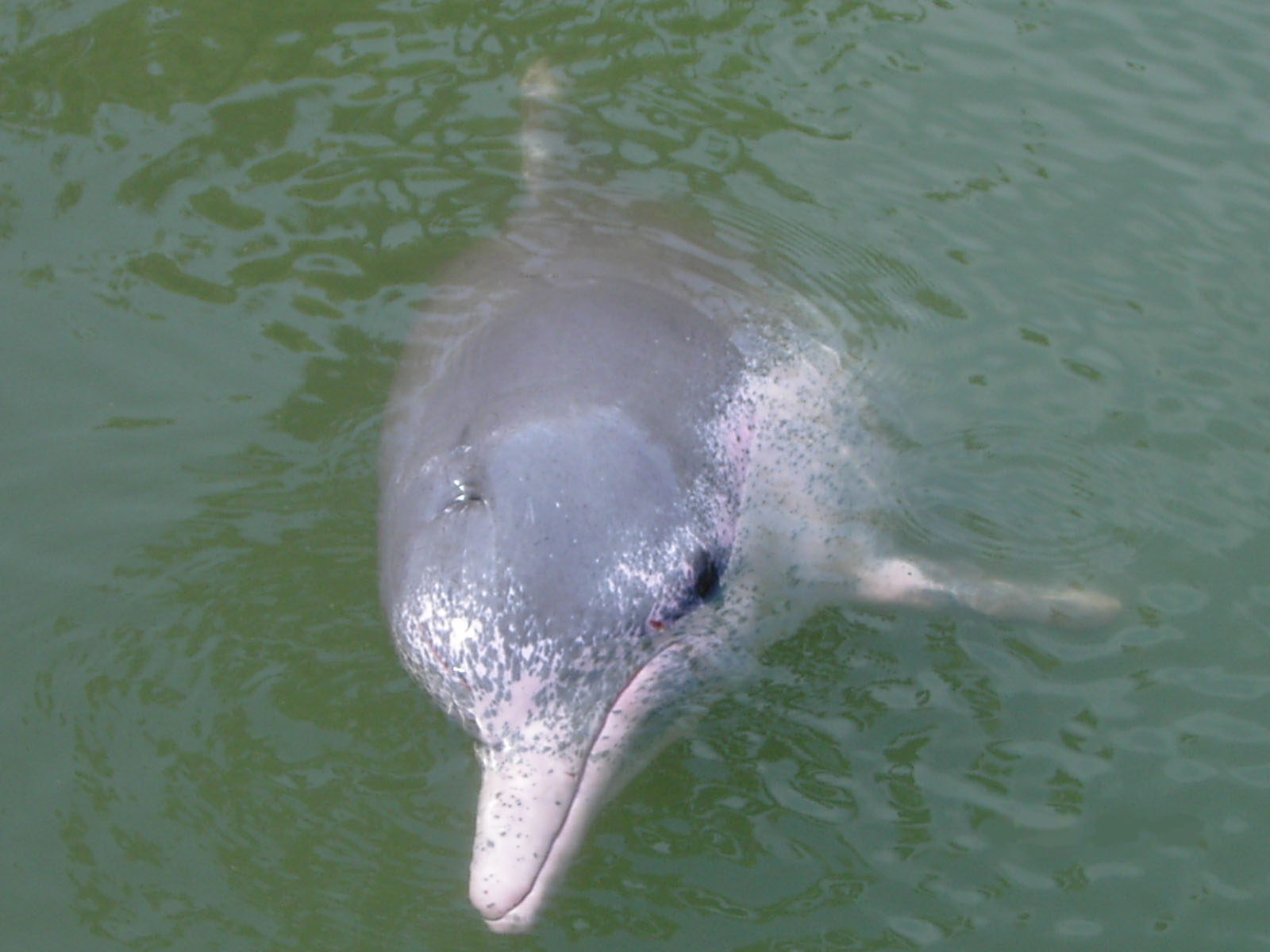
Chinese white dolphin

Hong Kong is home to many species despite being one of the most densely populated areas in the world. In a 2025 report, the World Wide Fund for Nature (WWF) Hong Kong counted 584 bird species, 272 butterfly species, 134 dragonfly species, 71 reptile species, 70 freshwater fish species, 24 amphibian species, 24 freshwater crustacean species, and 18 species of medium to large non-volant (flightless) land mammals. In addition to the 8 groups assessed in the WWF report, Hong Kong has 25 species of bats, 20 species of marine mammals, 120 species of intertidal invertebrates, about 350 species of angiosperms and gymnosperms, and 11 species of small non-volant land mammals.

In 2020, the BBC reported that the population of the critically endangered pink dolphin (Sousa chinensis), also called the Chinese white dolphin, had dropped by 60% around the area of construction for a bridge between Hong Kong and Macau.

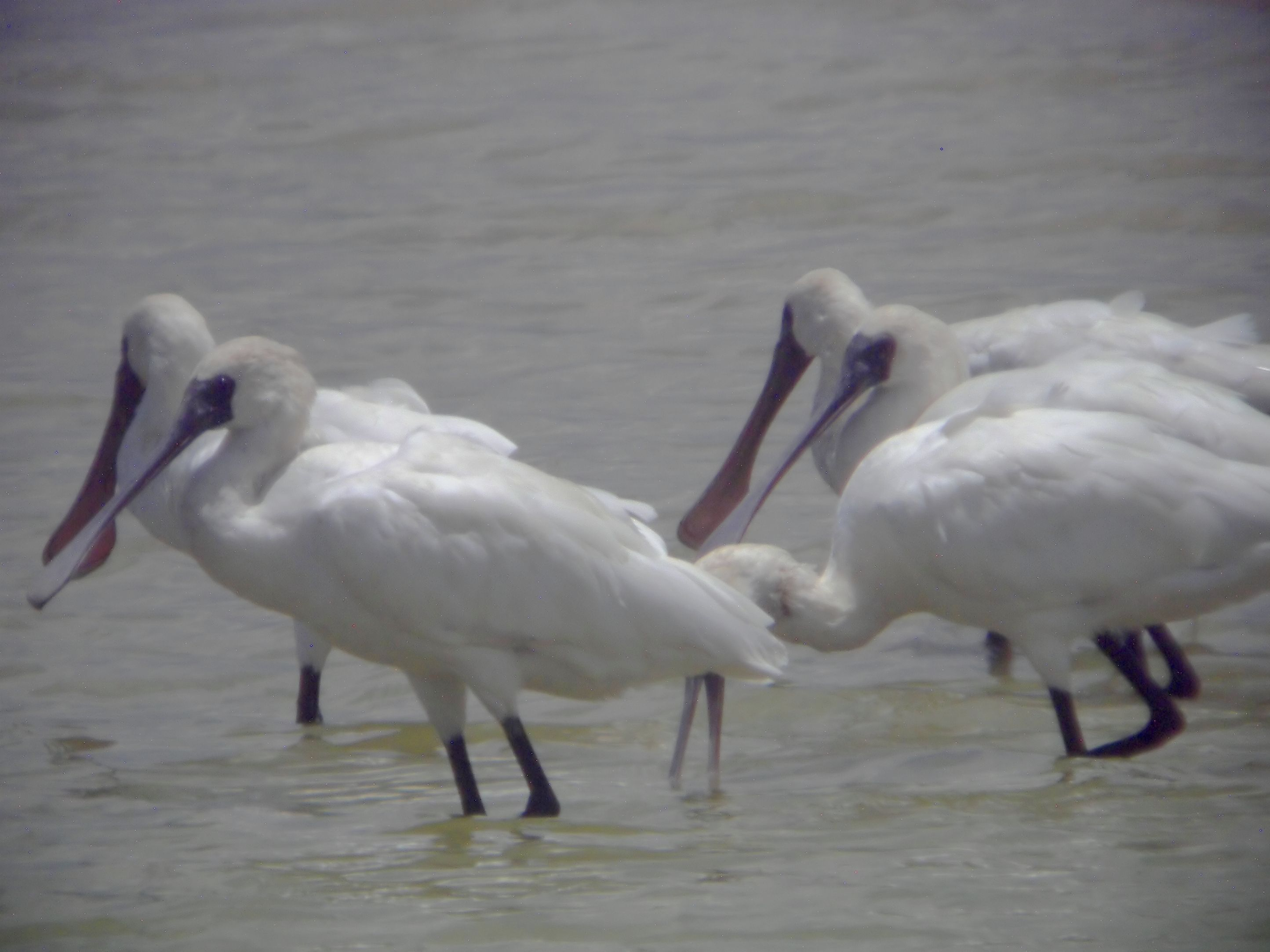
Black-faced spoonbill

Numbers of the endangered black-faced spoonbill (Platalea minor) wintering in Mai Po Marshes rose from roughly 35 in the late 1980s to 152 after 10 years. About 400 were spotted near the end of 2000. Despite an increase in the worldwide black-faced spoonbill population from 2024 to 2025, the local population decreased from 375 to 328.

Horseshoe crab species found in Hong Kong waters include Tachypleus tridentatus and Carcinoscorpius rotundicauda, in addition to some reported sightings of Tachypleus gigas.

== Ecosystems in Hong Kong ==
=== Coastline ===
Hong Kong has 733 kilometres of coastline with a tidal range of about 1.4 metres. Coastal habitats are broadly categorized as soft or rocky shores, with rocky shores being more exposed to tidal and temperature changes and soft shores being more sheltered.

==== Rocky shores ====
The distribution of species situated in rocky shores must be tolerant of conditions when the shore is covered with seawater at high tide and when the shore is directly exposed at low tide. Mobile species adapt to these varying conditions by successfully exploiting microhabitats such as cracks and crevices, or pools of water that remain during low tide. However, sessile organisms that filter-feed, like barnacles and oysters, may die in large numbers during the heat of summer, then recolonize during cooler months.

Rocky shores can be categorized according to how exposed they are. Tai Tam and Tolo Harbour are two areas that have sheltered rocky shores, while exposed rocky shores can be found at Big Wave Bay and Shek O. Areas like Stanley and Middle Bay are semi-exposed.

==== Soft shores ====
Soft shores occur in sheltered areas with low wave disturbance. This allows for the deposition of finer sediment than on rocky shores. The amount of sediment varies and can result in different types of habitat such as mudflats, sandy beaches, and mangrove forests.

===== Mangroves =====
Mangrove forests are habitats in tropical and subtropical intertidal zones, occurring on soft shores that receive tidal flushing from nearby fresh water sources. The Pearl River is one such fresh water source and it promotes mangrove growth in the Deep Bay area. Of the eight species of mangrove local to Hong Kong, Kandelia obovata is the most common.

Some mangrove stands that have been designated as Sites of Special Scientific Interest (SSSI):

- Mai Po Marshes
- Tsim Bei Tsui
- Tai Tam Harbour
- Pak Nai
- Ting Kok
- Hoi Ha Wan
- Kei Ling Ha
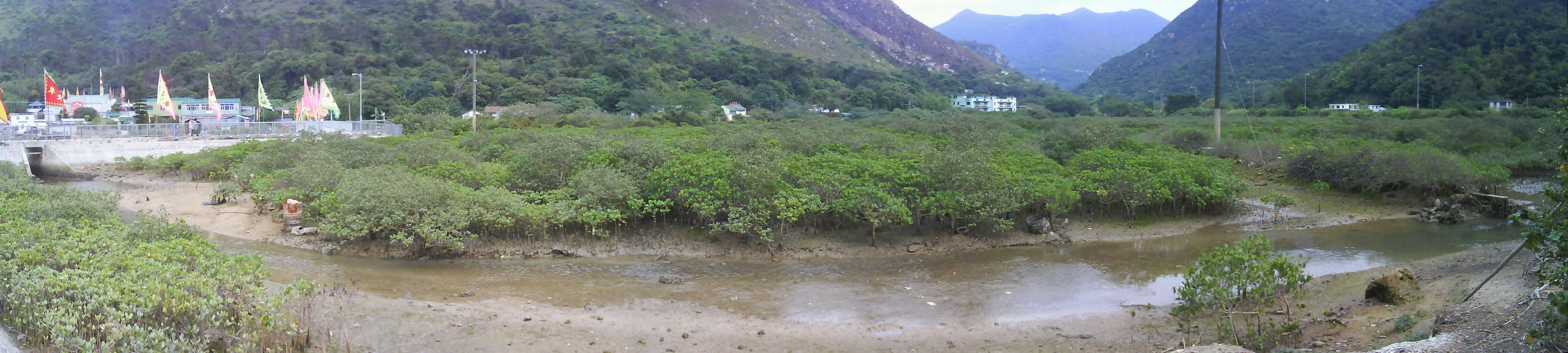
Mangroves in Tai O

=== Fresh water ===
Freshwater habitats can be classified by their rate of water flow. Lentic bodies of water are slow moving and can include lakes, wetlands, and agricultural fields. Lotic bodies of water are those that are fast moving like rivers and streams. Another factor that differentiates fresh water habitats is the amount of available oxygen. These factors influence animals' various adaptive responses. They may have to attach themselves to surfaces in fast moving bodies of water like rivers or have a mechanism for obtaining maximum oxygen supply in bodies of water where this resource is scarce.

==== Rivers ====
Hong Kong has more than 200 streams and rivers, most of them short and without names. Some are natural and some, especially those in urban areas, have been altered and lined with concrete. These concrete lined rivers are called urban rivers or nullahs.

Some of the major rivers of Hong Kong:

- Kam Tin
- Lam Tseun
- Ng Tung
- Shan Pui
- Sheung Yue
- Shing Mun
- Tuen Mun
- Tung Chung

== Problems ==
=== Pollution ===
==== General ====
In 1989, the Hong Kong government realised that Hong Kong was in danger of becoming a vast, densely populated city. Due to the growth of the economy, the impacts of pollution were increasingly becoming evident in the environment.

Previously, Victoria Harbour suffered from pollution to such a degree that, despite a government plan to clean the harbour, environmentalists in 1995 worried that it was beyond repair. Since 2015 the water quality of the harbour has improved due to the full implementation of the Harbour Area Treatment Scheme (HATS) which began in 1994.

Oyster farms have been impacted by a mixture of pollution and competition from cheaper oyster cultivation across the border in China.

==== Air pollution ====
Air pollution is another problem. Factories, construction, and diesel vehicles have led to increased levels of particulate matter and nitrogen dioxide. Air pollution affects flora, fauna, and human health. Cases of asthma and bronchial infections have risen in recent years, and poor air quality is a factor.

==== Thermal pollution ====
According to a Baptist University study, daily average minimum temperatures have increased by 0.02 degrees (Celsius) annually between 1965 and 2003, due to the urban heat island effect, which traps heat during the daytime and releases it at night. Average daily maximum temperatures have fallen by 0.014 degrees each year, as air pollution blocks solar radiation. Resulting increased nighttime ambient temperatures incite families to use domestic air-conditioning, which further compounds the problem.

Research has shown that the ambient air-temperature in urban areas can be some 5 °C higher than non built-up areas. The Hong Kong Polytechnic University commissioned NASA to take a high-resolution thermal image of urban Hong Kong by satellite at 22:40 on 4 August 2007, which showed at least a four-degree difference between the coolest areas and the "urban heat islands". The variations are attributable to greater absorbency of man-made materials, and building density that restrict air-flow. The affected area had expanded into Hung Hom since January, when the first image was taken.

==== Wall effect ====
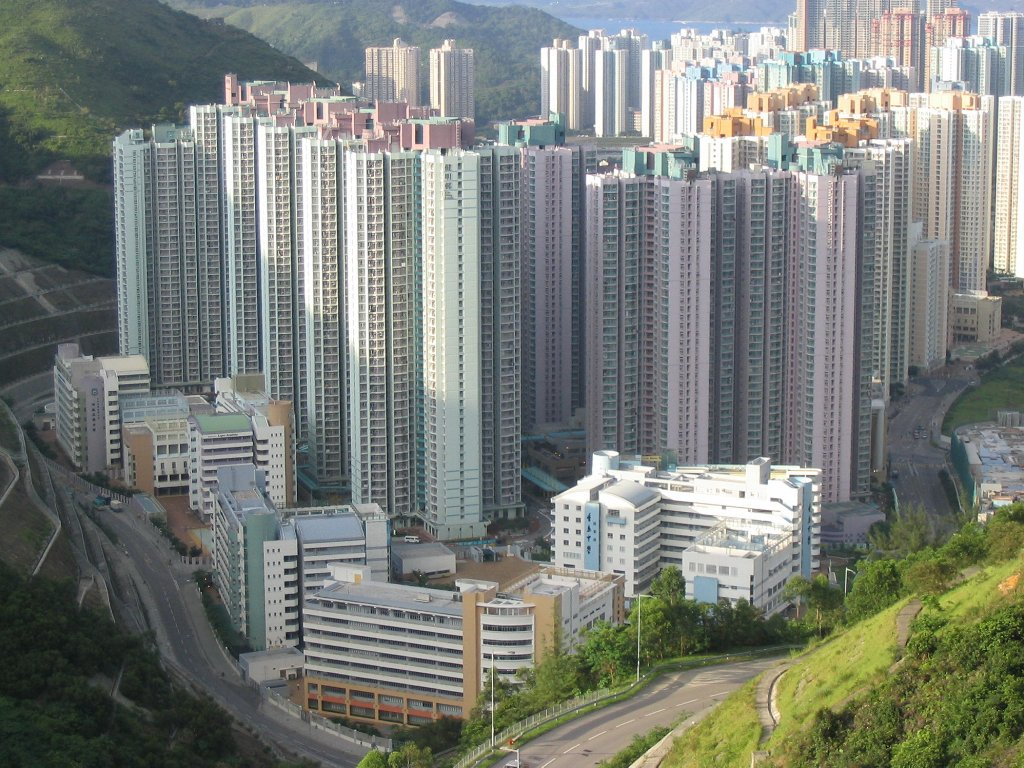
Highly-dense buildings can be seen in Tseung Kwan O.

There has been increasing concern since 2006 over the wall effect caused by uniform high-rise buildings that block most air circulation. Due to the population density of Hong Kong and the economies of scale of mass developments, most new tower block developments are mass-constructed in groups of 10 to 100, ranging from 30 to 70 stories high. Developers of housing estates are often financially motivated to maximize view at the expense of air circulation. Huge wall-like estates along the waterfront .

In-fill developments are typically constructed by smaller developers with less capital. These will be smaller in scale, and less prone to the wall effect.

Environmental group Green Sense expressed concern that their survey on 155 housing estates found 104 have a 'wall-like' design. It cited estates in Tai Kok Tsui and Tseung Kwan O as the "best examples". In May 2007, citing concern over developments in West Kowloon, and near Tai Wai and Yuen Long railway stations, some legislators called for a law to stop developers from constructing tall buildings that adversely affect airflow in densely populated areas, but the bid failed. In 2007, residents of Tai Kok Tsui, increasingly aware of the problem, have been lobbying against the further proliferation of such high-rises in their area that threaten the last air corridor.

=== Threats to flora and fauna ===
==== Destruction of habitat ====
- Encroachment of the green belt
- Effect of the Building Waste Levy

==== Illegal hunting of species by mainland Chinese ====
With increasing affluence of the mainland, some mainland Chinese people become able to afford luxury flora and fauna like Podocarpus macrophyllus (Cantonese: 羅漢松; Jyutping: lo4 hon3 cung4 ) and Cuora trifasciata (Cantonese: 金錢龜; Jyutping: gam1 cin2 gwai1). Some of these species are in danger of extinction due to increased hunting.

==== Introduction of non-indigenous/invasive species ====
Most of the introduced species do little harm to the ecology of Hong Kong. However, some species are invasive and cause massive damage to the ecology and/or economy of Hong Kong.

Examples are the pinewood nematode from North America and pine-needle scale insect from Taiwan, which together virtually eliminated the native Pinus massoniana in the 1970s and 1980s.

== Gallery ==
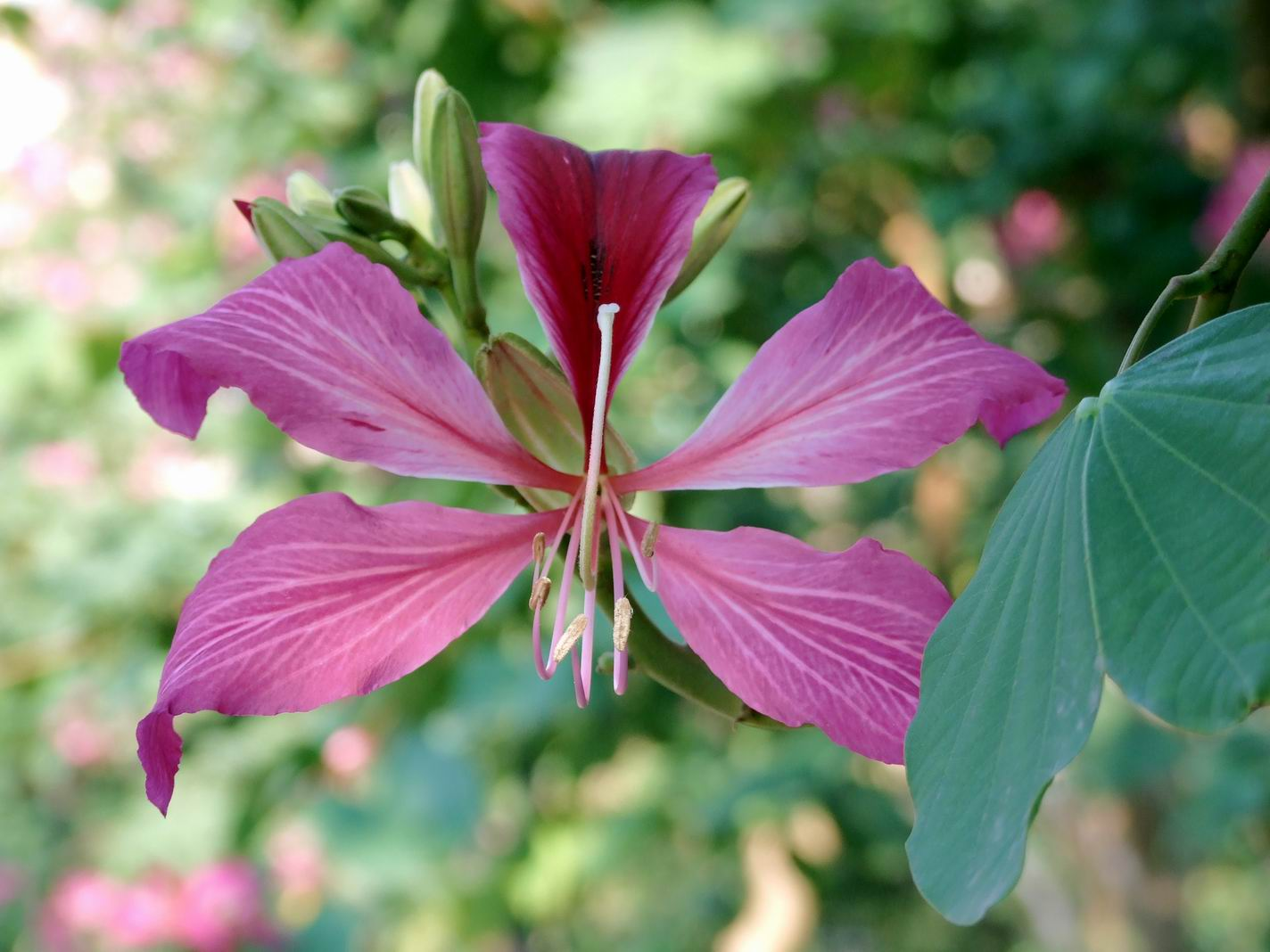
Hong Kong orchid tree

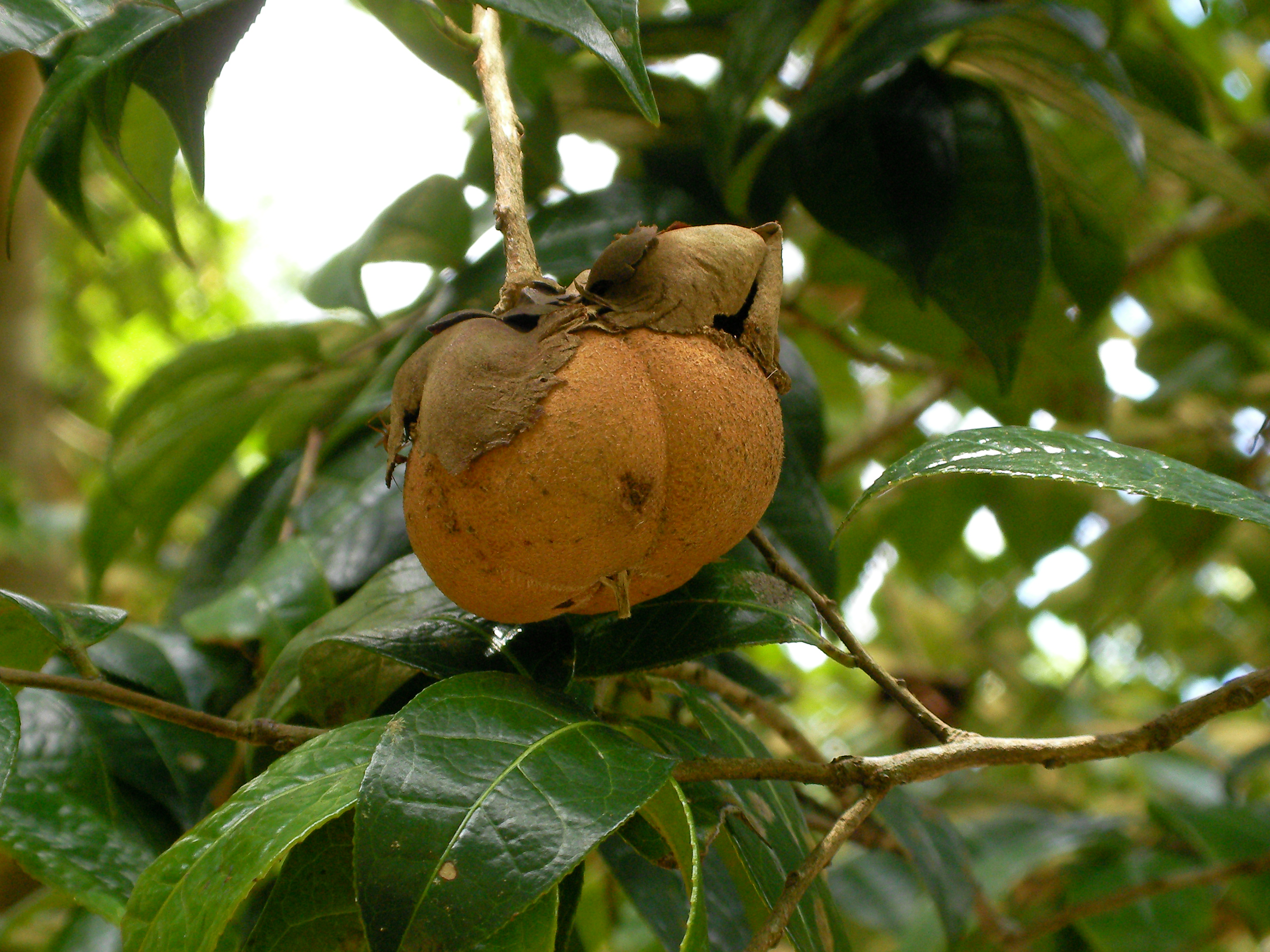
Fruit of Camellia granthamiana

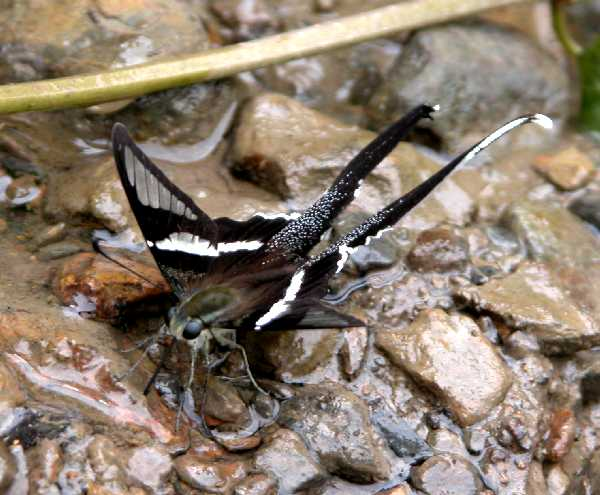
Lamproptera curius

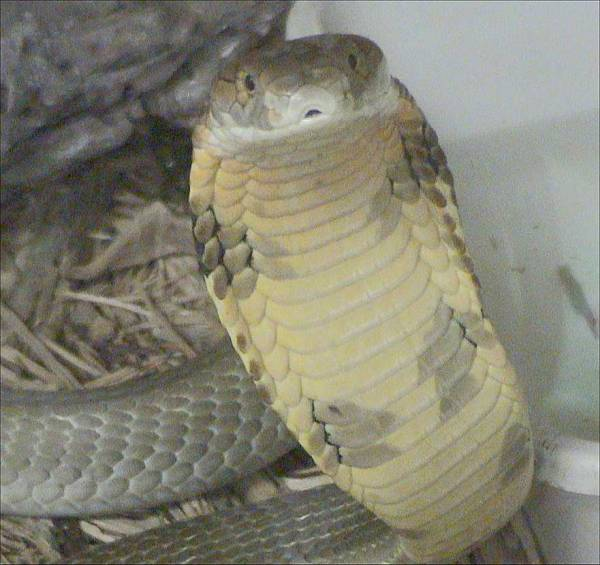
King cobra

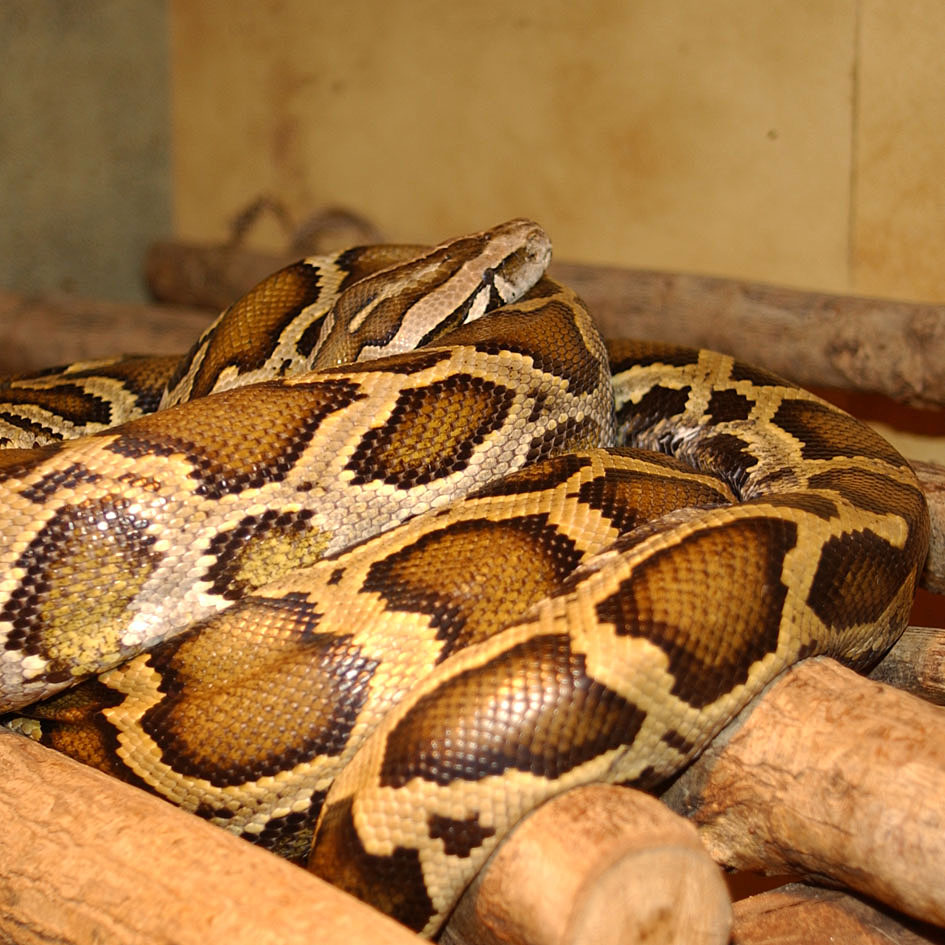
Burmese python

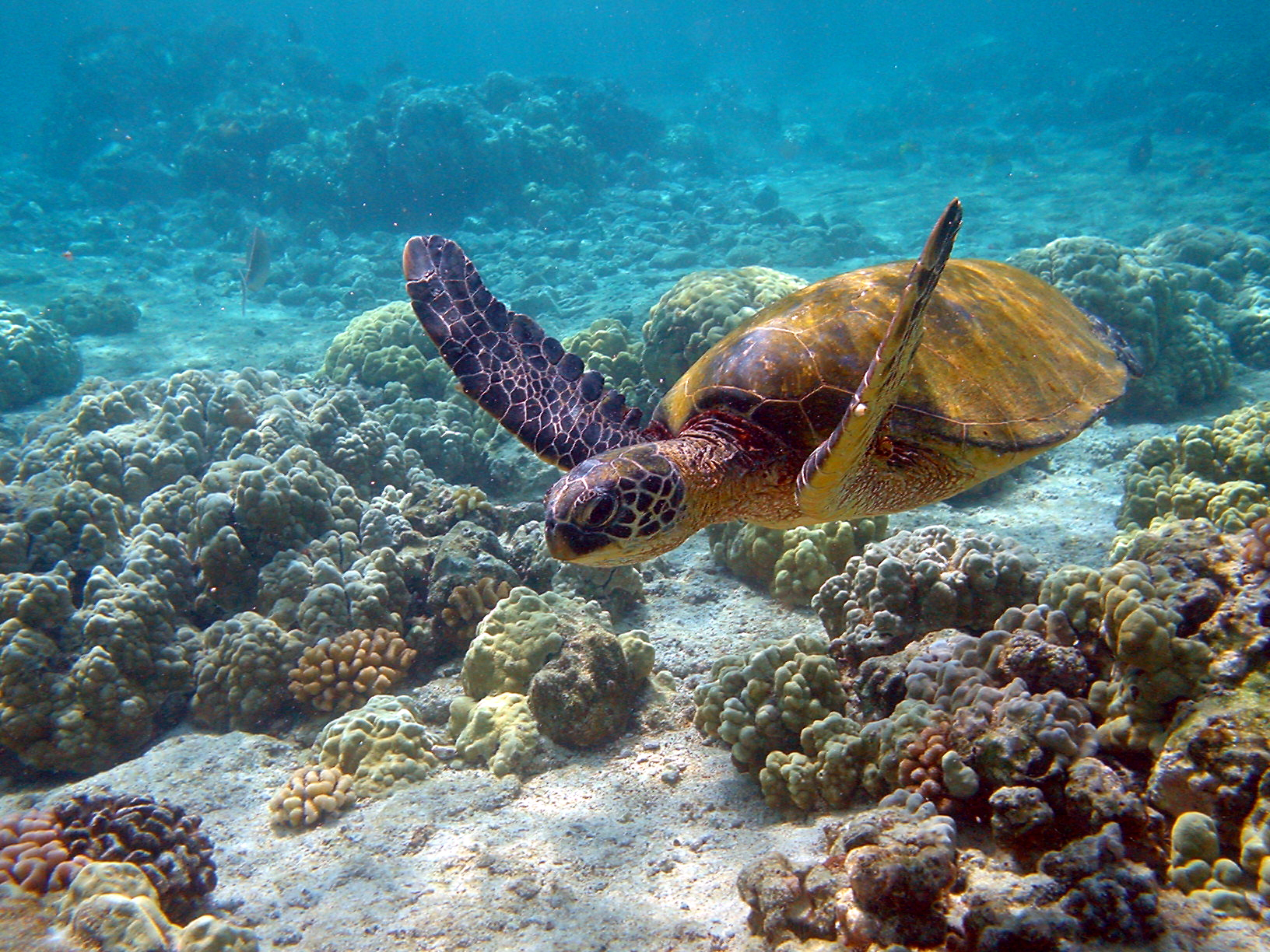
Green turtle

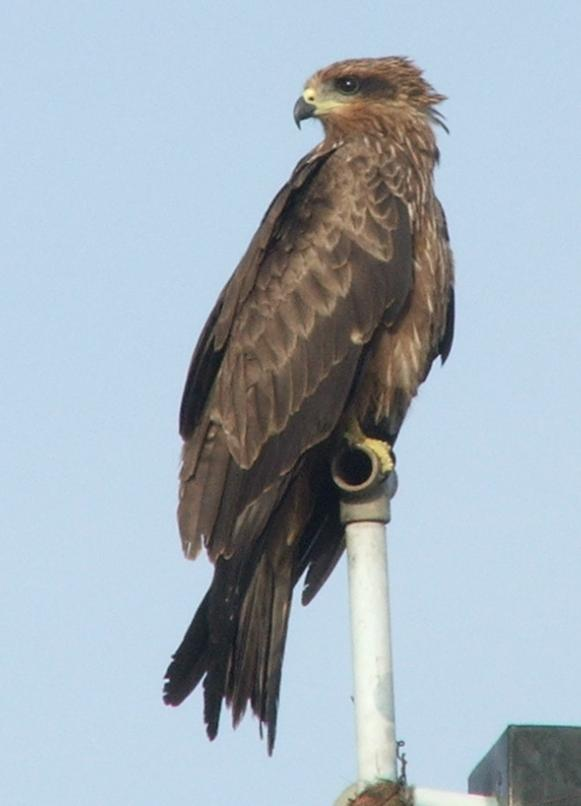
Black kite

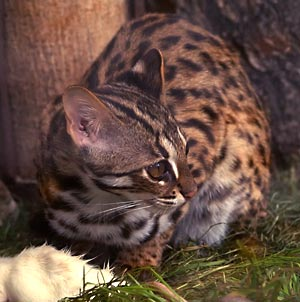
Leopard cat

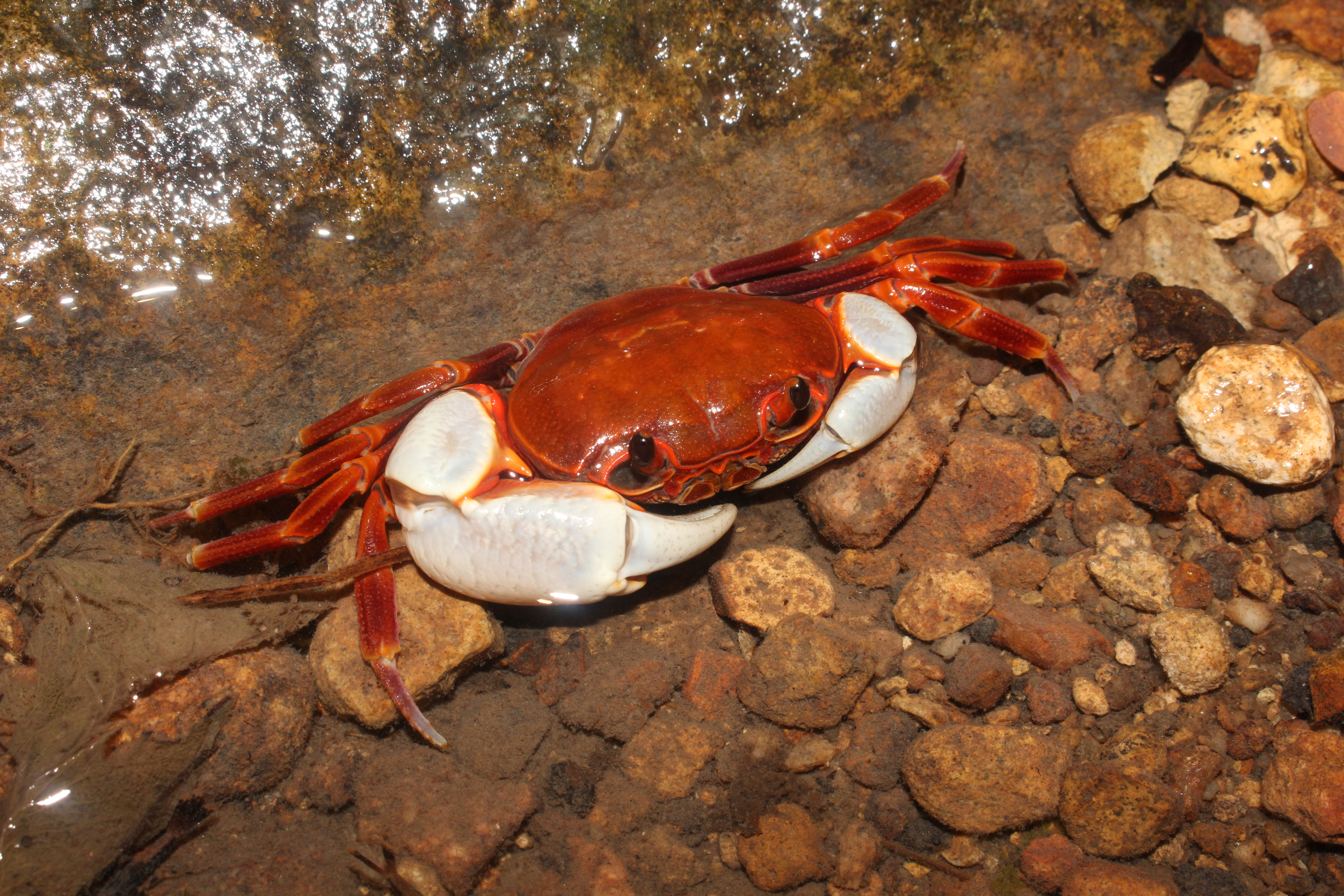
Nanhaipotamon hongkongense

== See also ==
- Geography of Hong Kong
- Conservation in Hong Kong
- Environment of mainland China
- List of protected species in Hong Kong
- Species first discovered in Hong Kong
- List of mammals of Hong Kong
- List of birds of Hong Kong
- List of amphibians of Hong Kong
- Hong Kong Dolphin Conservation Society
- Hong Kong Bird Watching Society
- Air pollution in Hong Kong
