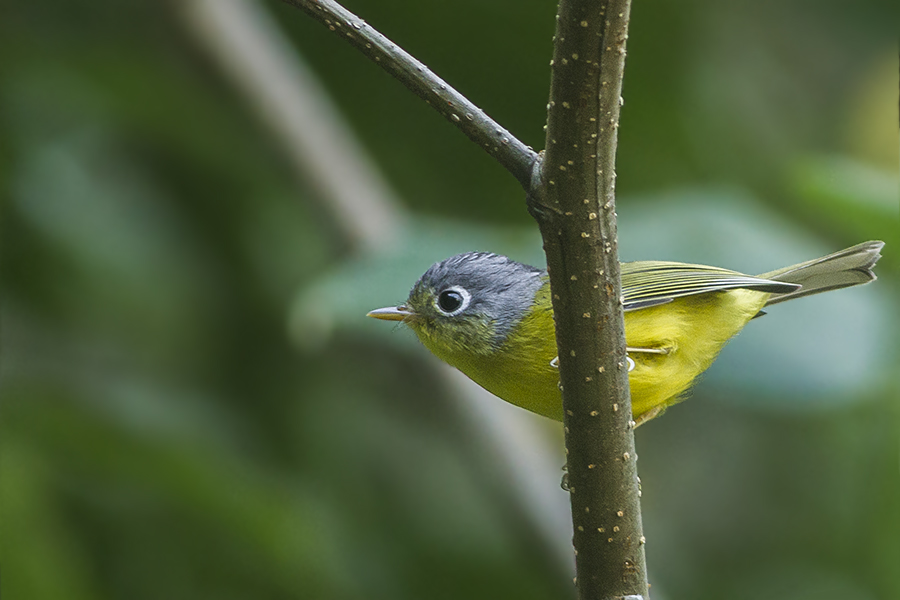
- White-spectacled warbler (Seicercus affinis)

Scientific classification
- Kingdom: Animalia
- Phylum: Chordata
- Class: Aves
- Order: Passeriformes
- Family: Phylloscopidae
- Genus: Seicercus; Swainson, 1837

= Seicercus =

Genus of birds

Seicercus is a genus of Old World warbler formerly in the family Sylviidae but now placed in Phylloscopidae. Recent scientific studies have recommended synonymizing this genus with Phylloscopus, and are placed there.

The genus is distributed in the Indian subcontinent and eastern Asia from northern China to Timor in the Lesser Sundas. Many of the more northerly species are migratory, breeding in temperate climates and wintering in the tropics; others are attitudinal migrants, moving down from the mountains in the winter. A few species are migratory over part of their range and resident in others.

The Seicercus warblers are small passerines that range in size from 9.5 to 12 cm in length and weigh around 4-9 g. All species have green wings and yellow bellies, most have yellow breasts as well. The head is either grey, green or buff/brown, and all species have stripes on the crown or face as well as a yellow or white eye-ring. The sexes are similar to each other.

Seicercus warblers feed on insects, usually obtained by gleaning and short sally flights. A few species associate with mixed-species feeding flocks. Different species feed in different parts of the forest, some, like the chestnut-crowned warbler feed in the canopy whereas the Sunda warbler prefers the understory and lower canopy.

It contained the following species:

- White-spectacled warbler (Seicercus affinis)
- Green-crowned warbler (Seicercus burkii)
- Chestnut-crowned warbler (Seicercus castaniceps)
- Sunda warbler (Seicercus grammiceps)
- Yellow-breasted warbler (Seicercus montis)
- Martens's warbler (Seicercus omeiensis)
- Grey-cheeked warbler (Seicercus poliogenys)
- Alström's warbler (Seicercus soror)
- Grey-crowned warbler (Seicercus tephrocephalus)
- Bianchi's warbler (Seicercus valentini)
- Whistler's warbler (Seicercus whistleri)

Grey-hooded warbler (Phylloscopus xanthoschistos) was formerly included in this genus.

== Taxonomic note ==
The species known as golden-spectacled warbler Seicercus burkii (Sibley and Monroe 1990, 1993) was split into S. burkii, S. valentini, S. whistleri, S. soror and S. tephrocephalus following Alström & Olsson (1999) and S. omeiensis following Martens et al. (1999).
