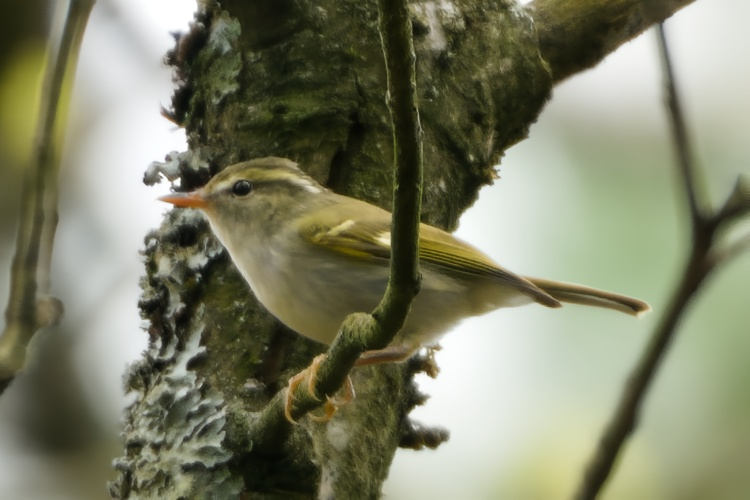

Conservation status
- Least Concern (IUCN 3.1)

Scientific classification
- Kingdom: Animalia
- Phylum: Chordata
- Class: Aves
- Order: Passeriformes
- Family: Phylloscopidae
- Genus: Phylloscopus
- Species: P. claudiae

Binomial name
- Phylloscopus claudiae (La Touche, 1922)

= Claudia's leaf warbler =

Species of bird

Claudia's leaf warbler (Phylloscopus claudiae) is a leaf warbler found only in China. Its natural habitat is temperate forests. Most taxonomists previously considered it to be a subspecies of the Blyth's leaf warbler.
