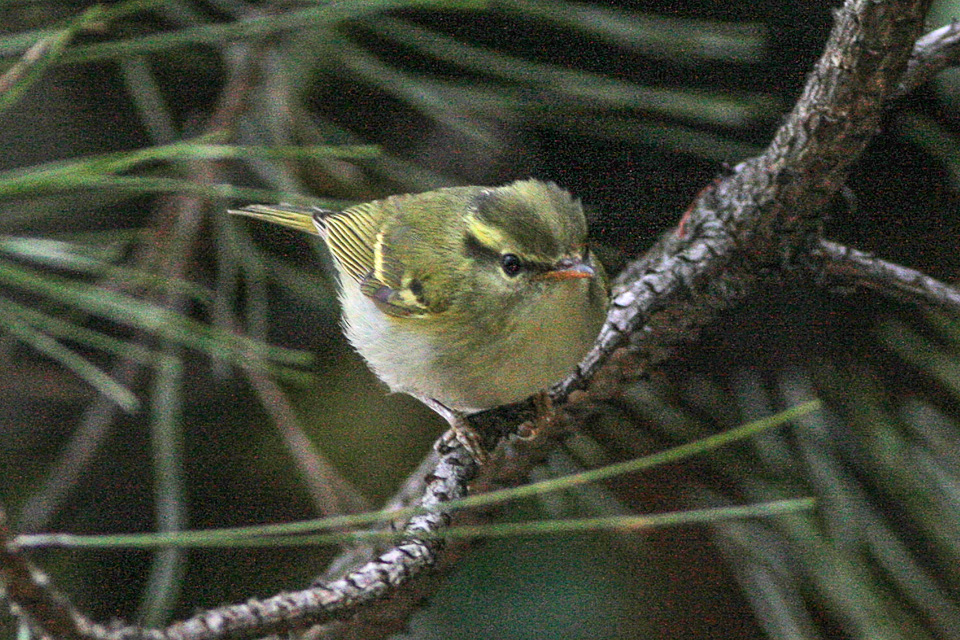

Conservation status
- Least Concern (IUCN 3.1)

Scientific classification
- Kingdom: Animalia
- Phylum: Chordata
- Class: Aves
- Order: Passeriformes
- Family: Phylloscopidae
- Genus: Phylloscopus
- Species: P. ogilviegranti

Binomial name
- Phylloscopus ogilviegranti (La Touche, 1922)

= Kloss's leaf warbler =

Species of bird

Kloss's leaf warbler (Phylloscopus ogilviegranti) is a leaf warbler found in Cambodia, China, Laos, Thailand, and Vietnam. Its natural habitats are temperate forests, subtropical or tropical moist lowland forests, and subtropical or tropical moist montane forests.

Kloss's leaf warbler was formerly considered as a subspecies of Davison's leaf warbler. It was promoted to species status based on evidence from both molecular genetic and vocalization studies.
