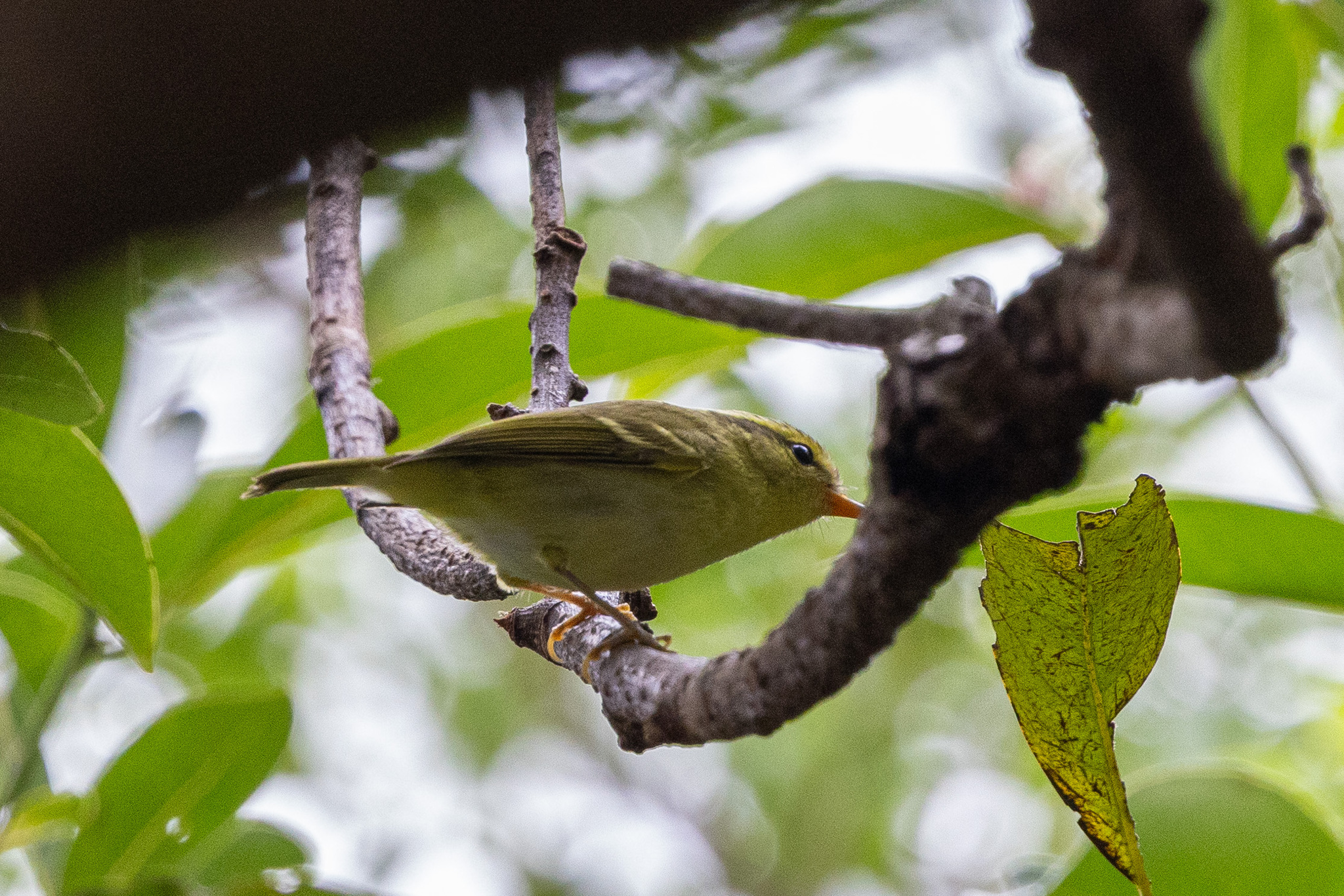

Conservation status
- Least Concern (IUCN 3.1)

Scientific classification
- Kingdom: Animalia
- Phylum: Chordata
- Class: Aves
- Order: Passeriformes
- Family: Phylloscopidae
- Genus: Phylloscopus
- Species: P. goodsoni

Binomial name
- Phylloscopus goodsoni Hartert, 1910

= Hartert's leaf warbler =

Species of bird

Hartert's leaf warbler (Phylloscopus goodsoni) is a leaf warbler found only in China. Its natural habitats are temperate forests and subtropical or tropical moist lowland forests. It was previously considered a subspecies of Blyth's leaf warbler.
