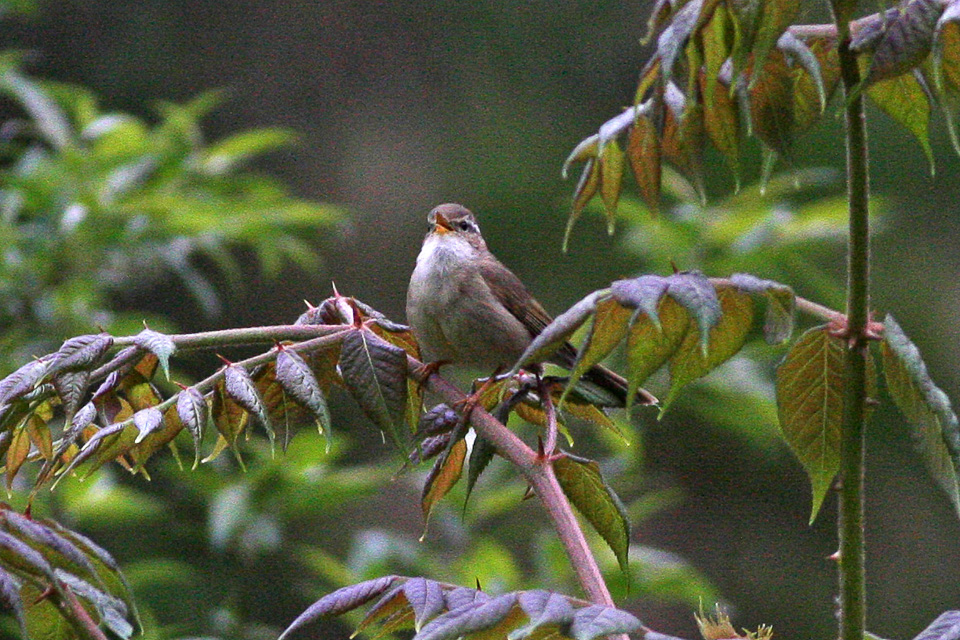

Conservation status
- Least Concern (IUCN 3.1)

Scientific classification
- Kingdom: Animalia
- Phylum: Chordata
- Class: Aves
- Order: Passeriformes
- Family: Phylloscopidae
- Genus: Phylloscopus
- Species: P. armandii

Binomial name
- Phylloscopus armandii (Milne-Edwards, 1865)

= Yellow-streaked warbler =

Species of bird

The yellow-streaked warbler (Phylloscopus armandii) is a species of leaf warbler (family Phylloscopidae). It was formerly included in the "Old World warbler" assemblage.

It breeds across much of China and migrates south to Yunnan and northern Southeast Asia. Its natural habitat is temperate forests.

It has a variety of vocalizations, with dozens of syllable types.
