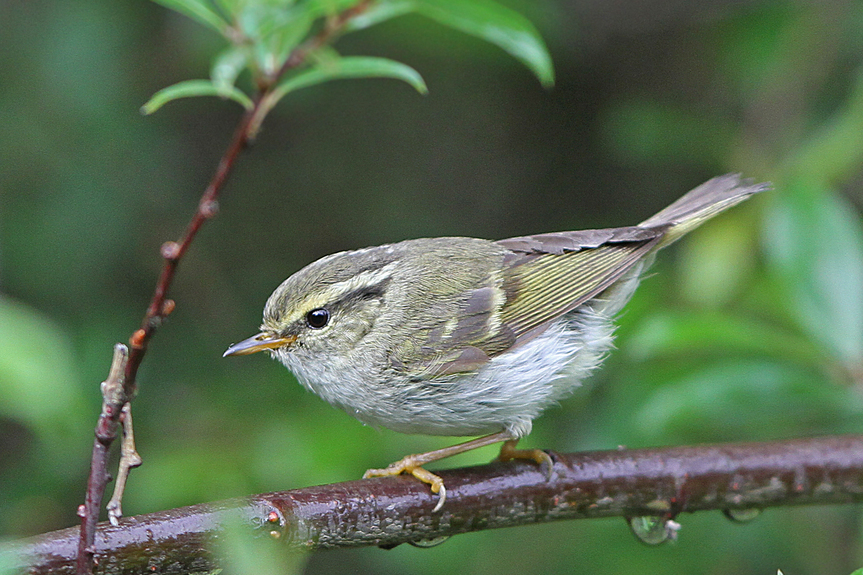

Conservation status
- Least Concern (IUCN 3.1)

Scientific classification
- Kingdom: Animalia
- Phylum: Chordata
- Class: Aves
- Order: Passeriformes
- Family: Phylloscopidae
- Genus: Phylloscopus
- Species: P. kansuensis

Binomial name
- Phylloscopus kansuensis Meise, 1933
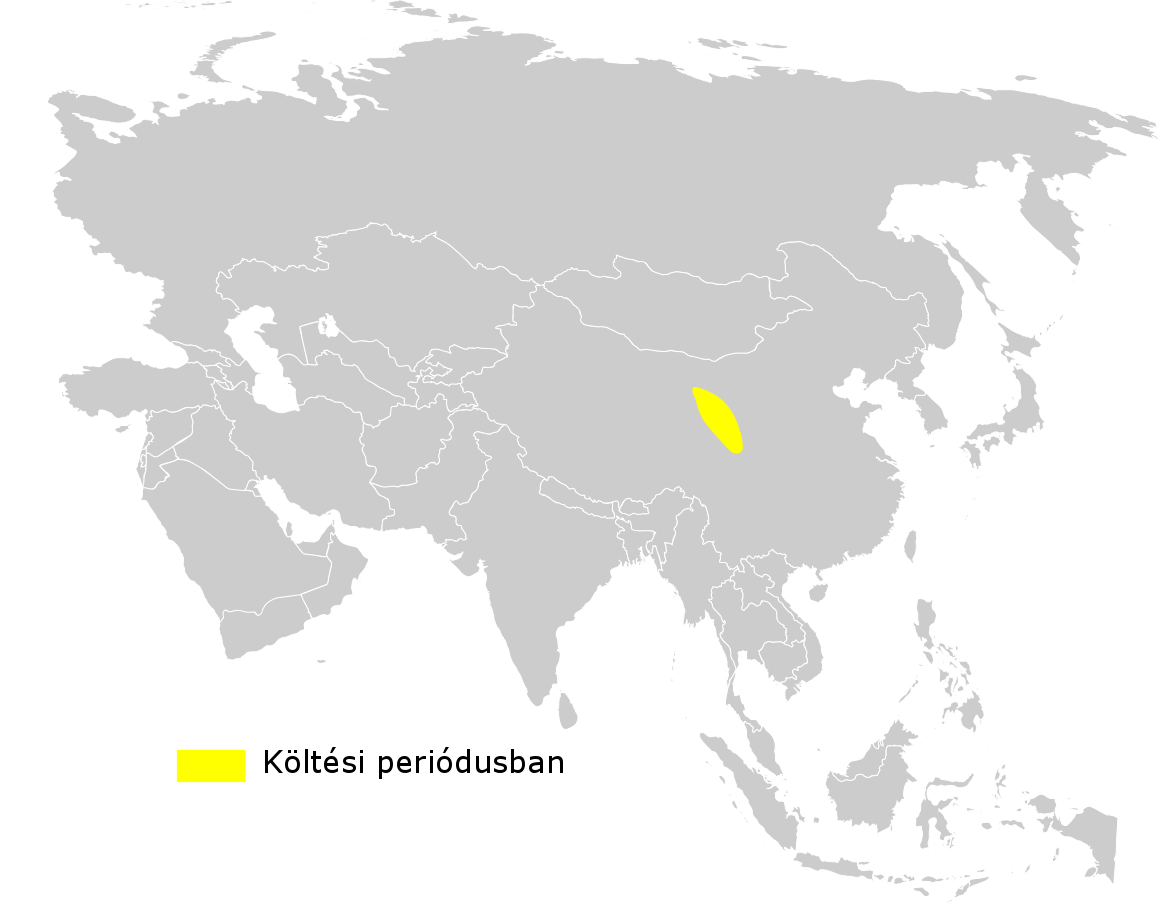

= Gansu leaf warbler =

Species of bird

The Gansu leaf warbler (Phylloscopus kansuensis) is a small passerine bird known only from China. It belongs to the leaf warbler genus Phylloscopus within the family Phylloscopidae. It was formerly treated as a subspecies of Pallas's warbler (P. proregulus) but is now regarded as a separate species based on differences in voice and cytochrome-b gene sequences.

It is 10 cm long, slightly larger than Pallas's warbler. It has greenish upperparts, pale underparts and a pale rump. The head has a long white supercilium and a pale stripe along the centre of the crown. The wings have one conspicuous wingbar, a slight second bar and whitish edges to the tertials.

The song is very different from Pallas's warbler and consists of a thin, high-pitched note followed by a series of accelerating notes and finally a trill.

It is known to breed only in Gansu and Qinghai provinces in northern China. Its wintering grounds are uncertain but probably lie in Yunnan province in southern China. It is found up to 3,200 metres above sea-level in deciduous forest with some spruce and juniper. It is not currently known to be threatened with extinction and so is classed as a species of Least Concern by BirdLife International.
