= Tokara leaf warbler =

Scientific classification
- Kingdom: Animalia
- Phylum: Chordata
- Class: Aves
- Order: Passeriformes
- Family: Phylloscopidae
- Genus: Phylloscopus
- Species: P. tokaraensis

Binomial name
- Phylloscopus tokaraensis Saitoh et al., 2026

Species of bird

The Tokara leaf warbler (Phylloscopus tokaraensis) is a species of leaf warbler from the Tokara Islands of Japan. There are two populations of the species on the islands of Izu and Tokara. The species is closely related to the Ijima's leaf warbler (Phylloscopus ijimae), they diverged from a common ancestor 3.2 million years ago. They are visually very similar but have noticeably different songs, as well as genetic differences. In the past, the birds used to be considered as a population of Ijima's leaf warbler. The holotype was collected in 2017 from Tokara.

The Tokara and Ijima's leaf warblers both have a uniformly grey crown without dark or pale stripes. The underside is whitish with the vent being pale yellow. The two species are visually indistinguishable. On the Nakanoshima, Kuchinoshima, Swanosejim and Akusekijima islands, the species occurs in broadleaf subtropical forest with bamboo undergrowth. It nests on bamboo (Pleioblastus linearis), mainly in forested habitats with bamboo undergrowth. Ijima's leaf warbler also migrates to these islands in summer. The wintering region is not known. Breeding has been recorded from the last week of April to the last week of May. The nests are globular and made from leaves of bamboo and other trees with linings of feathers, roots and pine needles. The clutch consisted of three to four pale blue eggs. The population found on Izu responds to the song recorded of Tokara but DNA sequence data suggests a deep divergence with no indication of gene-flow between the populations. There is no visible morphological difference and the population has not been named as a subspecies.

The species is among the commonest birds on Nakanoshima during the breeding season but the total distribution range is about 89 square kilometers.
