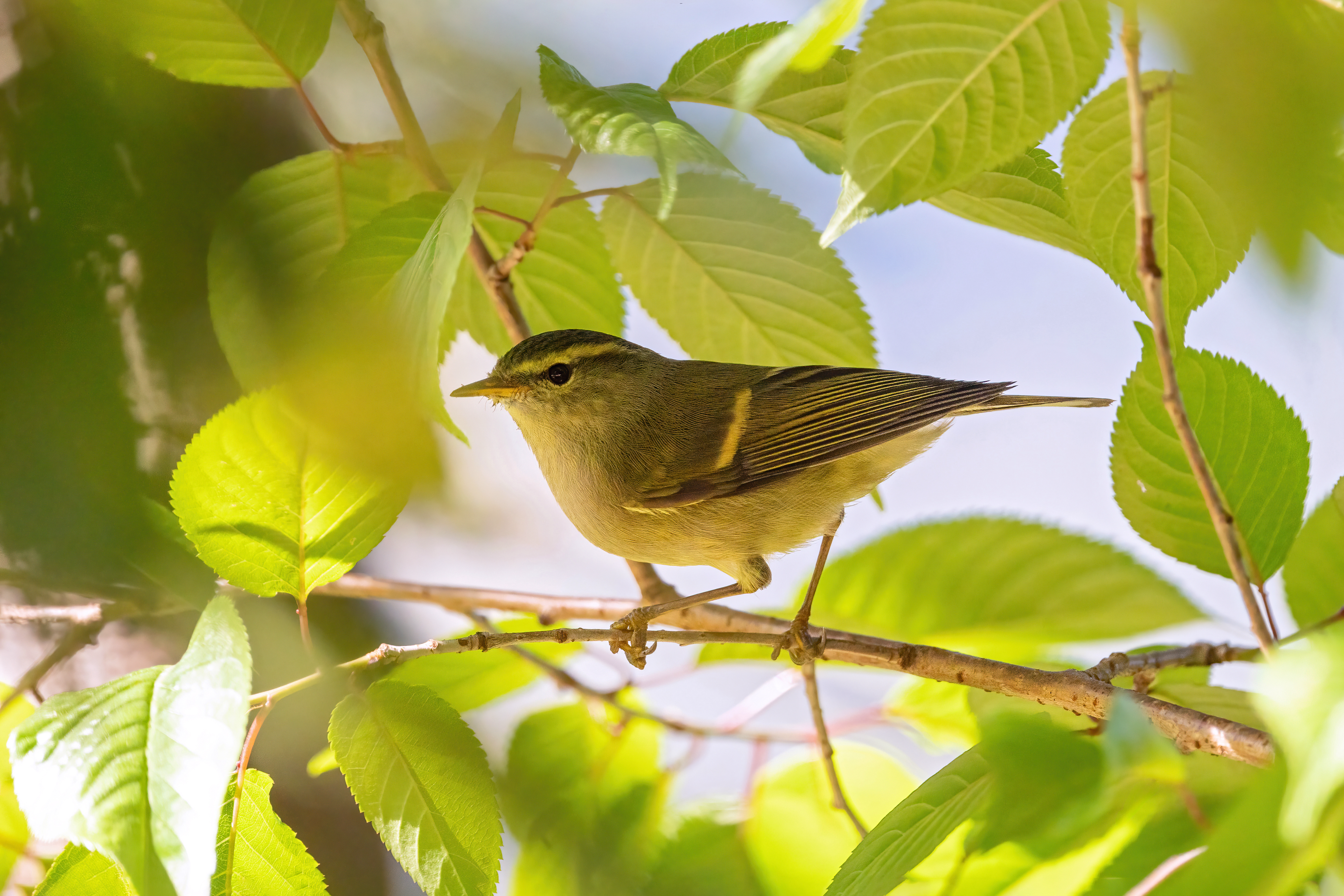
- At National Botanical Garden Lalitpur, Nepal

Conservation status
- Least Concern (IUCN 3.1)]

Scientific classification
- Kingdom: Animalia
- Phylum: Chordata
- Class: Aves
- Order: Passeriformes
- Family: Phylloscopidae
- Genus: Phylloscopus
- Species: P. pulcher

Binomial name
- Phylloscopus pulcher Blyth, 1845

= Buff-barred warbler =

Species of bird

The buff-barred warbler (Phylloscopus pulcher) is a species of leaf warbler (family Phylloscopidae). It was formerly included in the "Old World warbler" assemblage.

It is found in Bhutan, China, India, Laos, Myanmar, Nepal, Thailand, and Vietnam. Its natural habitats are boreal forests and temperate forests. It is primarily found at low altitudes.
