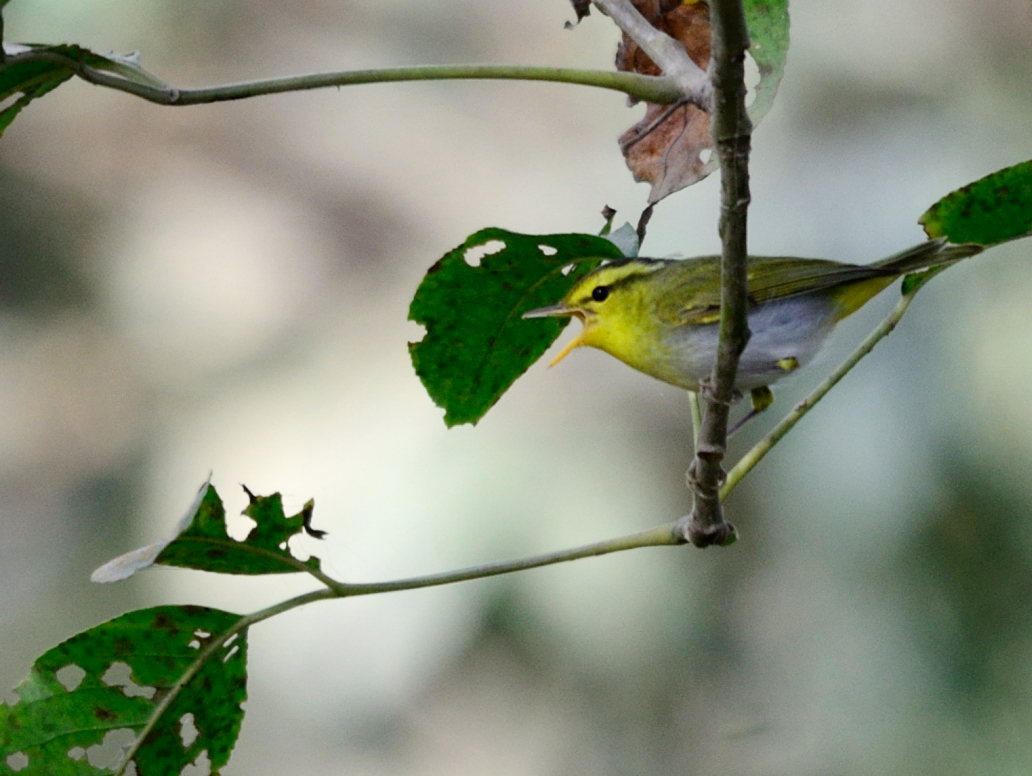

Conservation status
- Least Concern (IUCN 3.1)

Scientific classification
- Kingdom: Animalia
- Phylum: Chordata
- Class: Aves
- Order: Passeriformes
- Family: Phylloscopidae
- Genus: Phylloscopus
- Species: P. cantator

Binomial name
- Phylloscopus cantator (Tickell, 1833)

= Yellow-vented warbler =

Species of bird

The yellow-vented warbler (Phylloscopus cantator) is a species of leaf warbler (family Phylloscopidae). It was formerly included in the "Old World warbler" assemblage.

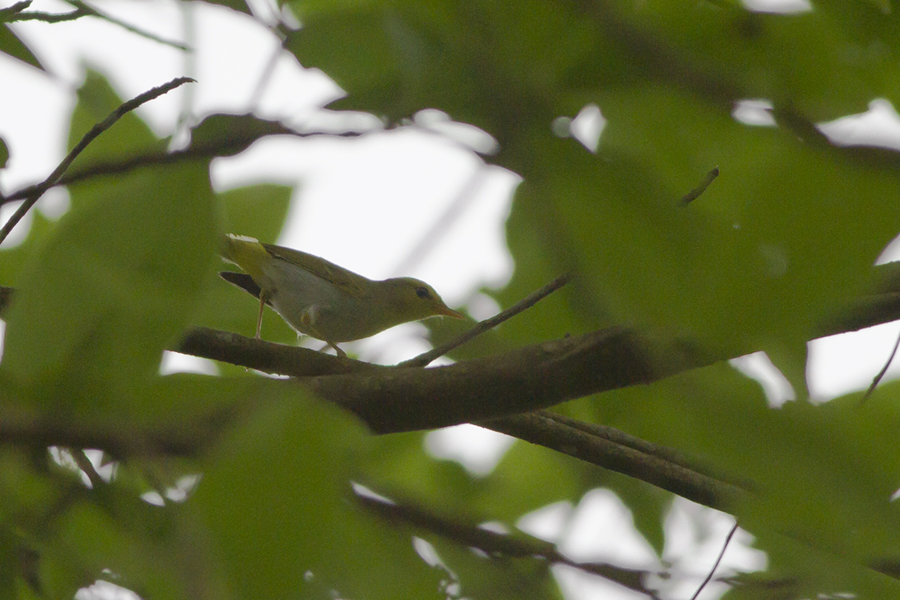
An individual not from a bird wave, from Mahananda Wildlife Sanctuary, West Bengal.

It is found in Bangladesh, Bhutan, China, India, Laos, Myanmar, Nepal, and Thailand. Its natural habitat is subtropical or tropical moist montane forests.

== Description ==
The yellow-vented warbler has a mass of 6-7 g and a size of about 11 cm (4.3 in).
