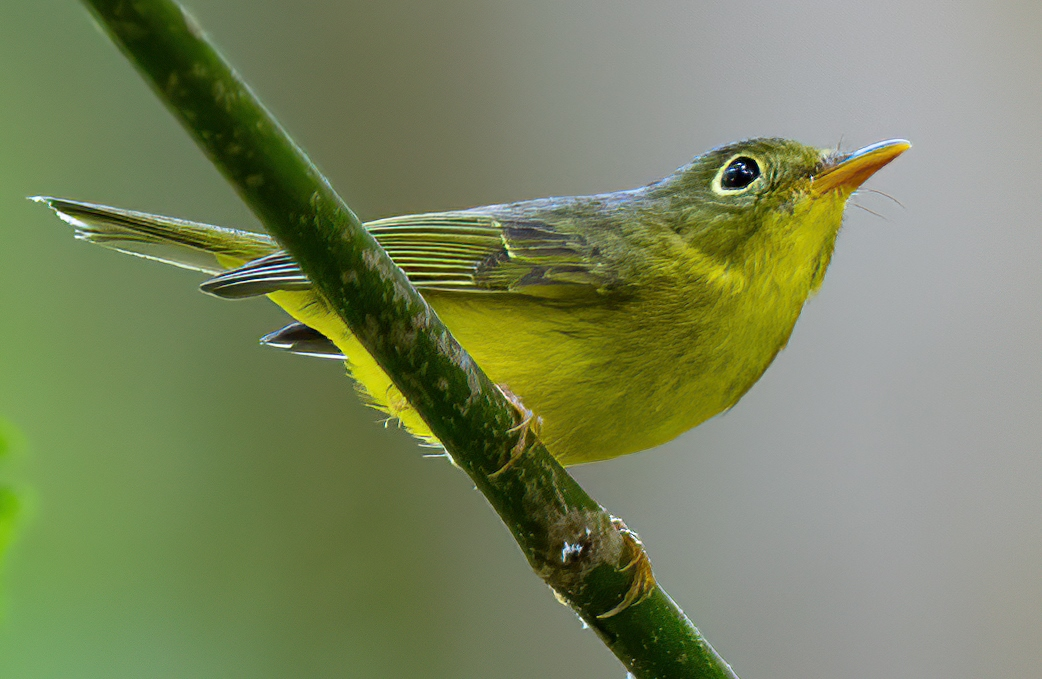
- In Vietnam during mid-winter

Conservation status
- Least Concern (IUCN 3.1)

Scientific classification
- Kingdom: Animalia
- Phylum: Chordata
- Class: Aves
- Order: Passeriformes
- Family: Phylloscopidae
- Genus: Phylloscopus
- Species: P. soror

Binomial name
- Phylloscopus soror (Alström & Olsson, 1999)
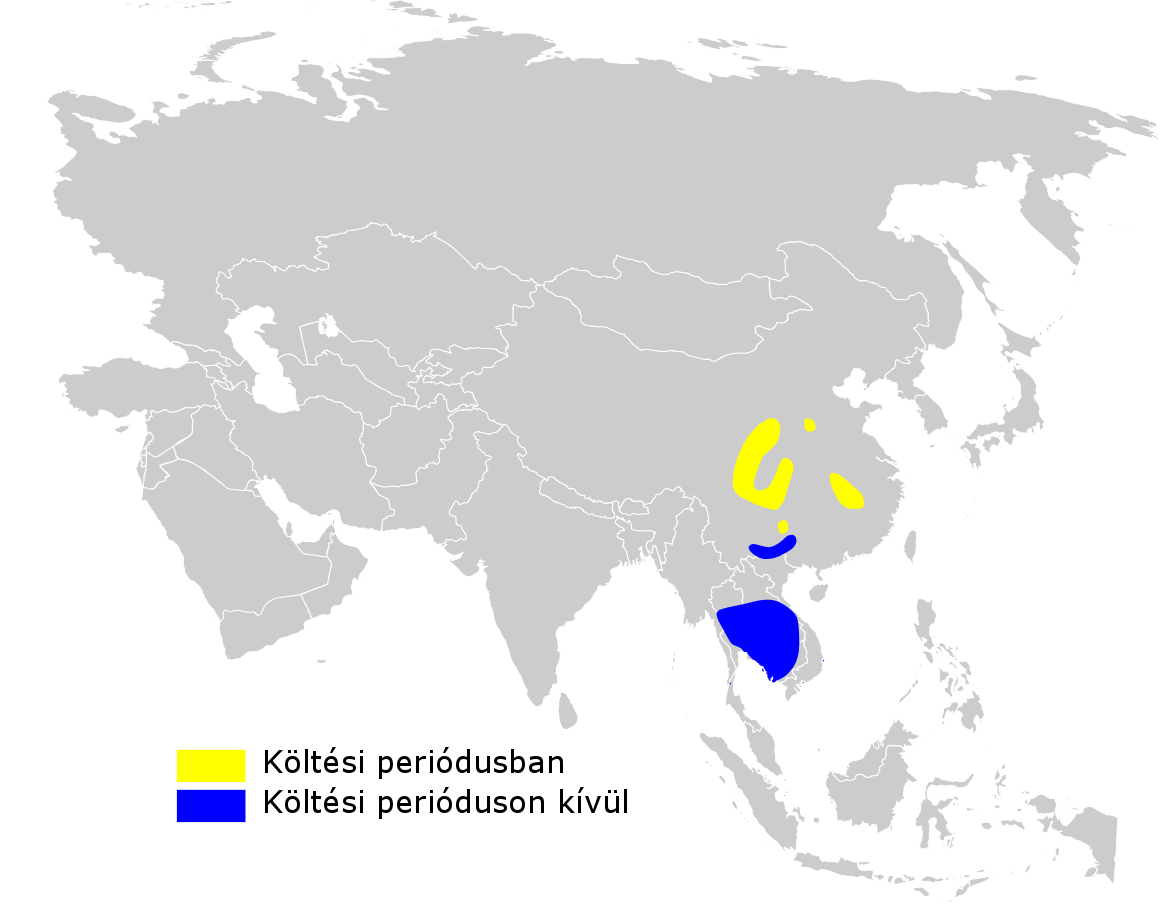
- summer range winter range

Synonyms
- Seicercus soror

= Alström's warbler =

Species of bird

Alström's warbler (Phylloscopus soror), or the plain-tailed warbler, is a species of Old World warbler in the family Phylloscopidae. It was first described in 1999. It breeds only in China and winters as far as Thailand, Laos, Cambodia and Vietnam. Its natural habitat is temperate forests.

== Habitat and migration ==
Alström's warbler often forages in a low, dense growth of forests. This bird is known to eat insects and catch prey during short flights. The bird is not currently globally threatened. This bird has a very large range and does not approach the potential of being a vulnerable species. The warbler typically breeds in warmer, temperate areas. These areas are found within evergreen broadleaf forest zones and lush undergrowth in mature forests. It has a scattered breeding range across central and eastern China. The warbler tends to breed in bushes and small trees of low to moderate height, in recently cleared areas. This bird is a migratory species. It migrates during the winter to southern Myanmar, Thailand, Cambodia, southern Vietnam, and southern China.

== Genus ==
Alström's warbler was previously placed in the genus Seicercus. A molecular phylogenetic study published in 2018 found that neither Phylloscopus nor Seicercus were monophyletic. In the subsequent reorganization the two genera were merged into Phylloscopus which has priority under the rules of the International Commission on Zoological Nomenclature. The common name honours the Swedish ornithologist Per Alström.

== Appearance and identification ==
Alström's warbler measures 11-12 cm in size. The female is on average smaller than the male. The Alström's warbler can be commonly mistaken for Martens's, Gray-crowned, White-speckled, and Bianchi's warblers. The bird has a greyish-black color that fades on the forehead as well as a mix of green that surrounds the eyes. The underside of the bird is a vibrant yellowish-green color whereas the wings and back have a grey crown with black stripes. This bird has a distinct yellow eye-ring that may diffuse above the eye. To distinguish this bird from others, the Alström's warbler is larger billed, smaller tailed, and has a more distinct white lining in the outer tail feathers than Martens's and Gray-crowned warblers.

== Breeding ==
Based on male singing activity, the mating activity of the warbler is from May to June. The non-breeding distribution and migratory periods are not fully known at this time. This bird has been located in southern China outside of its breeding range from early September to early October. The warbler has been seen in Thailand during mid-September, as well as in southern Vietnam in late September. The non-breeding warbler has been observed in southern Myanmar up until mid-April. The warbler has been spotted on Chinese breeding grounds in late April. Its distribution in the non-breeding season is hard to estimate because there is an overlap of non-singing similar species which makes identification very difficult.

== Birdsong ==
This bird has a very simple song, which consists of short, quick strophes, typically with a short chip as an introductory note. The introductory note is followed by 2-5 short, whistled notes. The whistled notes are arranged into an element group that is usually given 2-4 times, followed by a pause. The warbler has a distinctly higher-pitched and broader frequency span than the P. valentini. The song can be easily simplified by a brief che-witchy-chew-witchy-chew.
