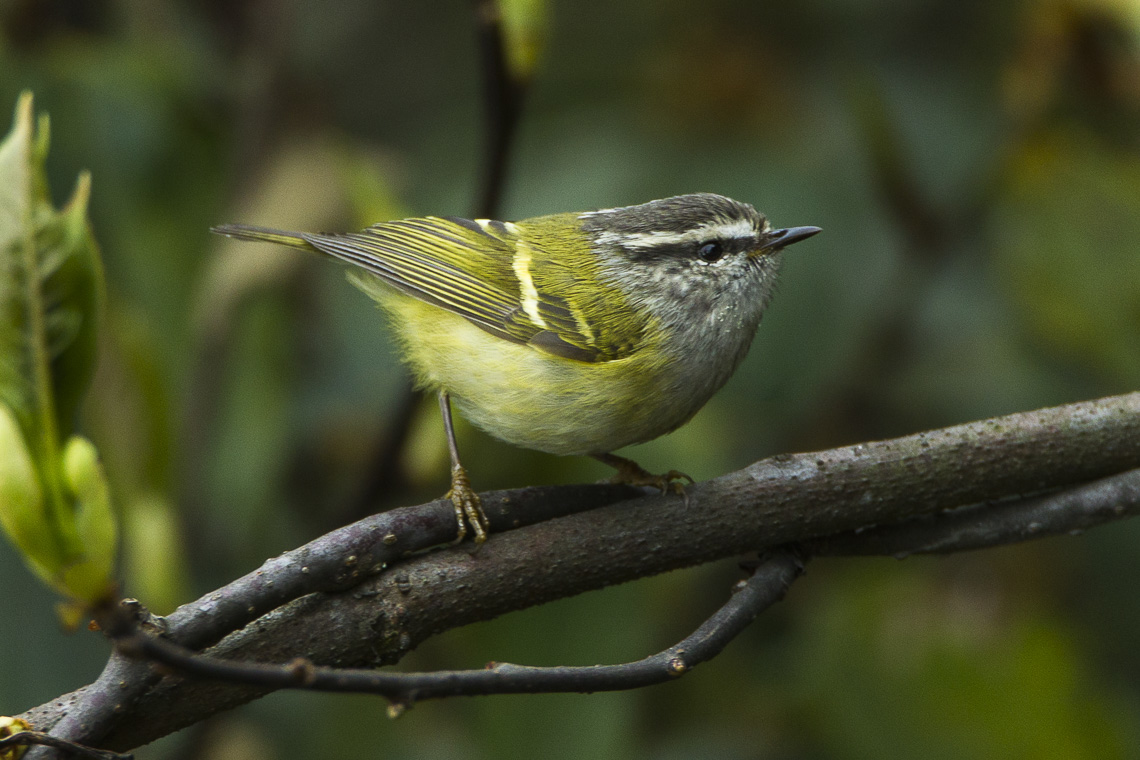
- in Bhutan

Conservation status
- Least Concern (IUCN 3.1)

Scientific classification
- Kingdom: Animalia
- Phylum: Chordata
- Class: Aves
- Order: Passeriformes
- Family: Phylloscopidae
- Genus: Phylloscopus
- Species: P. maculipennis

Binomial name
- Phylloscopus maculipennis (Blyth, 1867)

= Ashy-throated warbler =

Species of bird

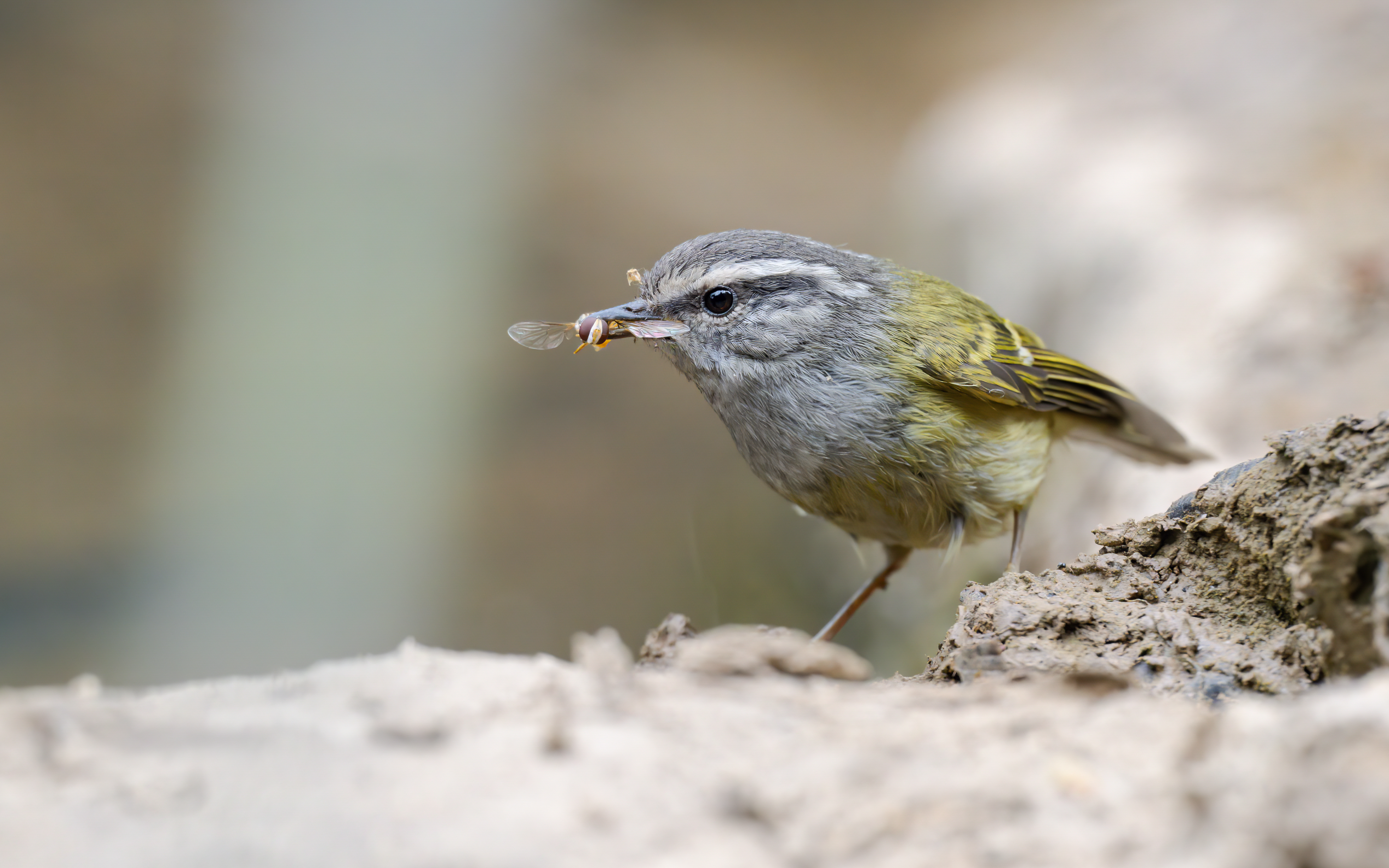
Ashy thorated warbler found in Nepal

The ashy-throated warbler (Phylloscopus maculipennis) is a species of leaf warbler (family Phylloscopidae). It was formerly included in the "Old World warbler" assemblage.

It is found in the Himalayas, Yunnan, Northeast India and northern Indochina. Its natural habitats are temperate forests and subtropical or tropical moist lowland forests.
