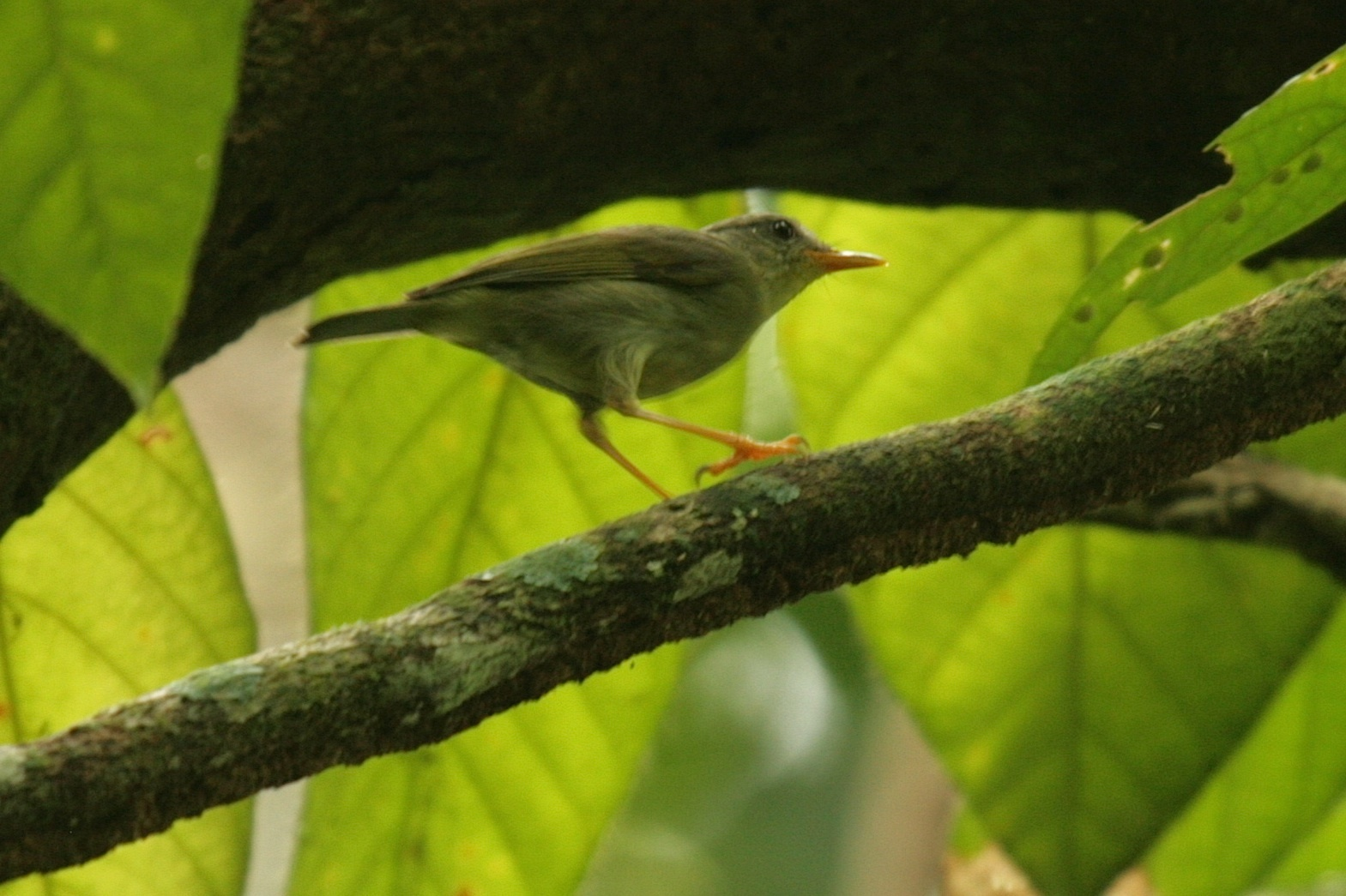

Conservation status
- Near Threatened (IUCN 3.1)

Scientific classification
- Kingdom: Animalia
- Phylum: Chordata
- Class: Aves
- Order: Passeriformes
- Family: Phylloscopidae
- Genus: Phylloscopus
- Species: P. misoriensis

Binomial name
- Phylloscopus misoriensis Meise, 1931

= Biak leaf warbler =

Species of bird

The Biak leaf warbler (Phylloscopus misoriensis) is a species of Old World warbler in the family Phylloscopidae. It is only found in Biak, Indonesia.
