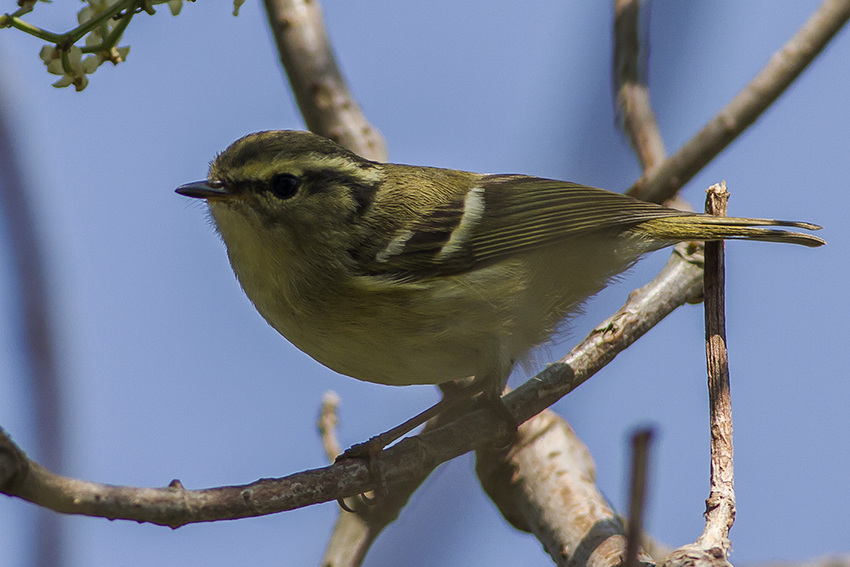
- In Fambong Lho Wildlife Sanctuary, Sikkim, India

Conservation status
- Least Concern (IUCN 3.1)

Scientific classification
- Kingdom: Animalia
- Phylum: Chordata
- Class: Aves
- Order: Passeriformes
- Family: Phylloscopidae
- Genus: Phylloscopus
- Species: P. chloronotus

Binomial name
- Phylloscopus chloronotus (Gray, JE & Gray, GR, 1847)

= Lemon-rumped warbler =

Species of bird

The Lemon-rumped Warbler (Phylloscopus chloronotus), also known as the Pale-rumped

Warbler, is a small species of Old World warbler in the family Phylloscopidae. It is native to the Himalayas, breeding in montane forests and wintering in the southern foothills and the Purvanchal Range. The species is structurally identical to the Sichuan Leaf Warbler (Phylloscopus forresti), but differs in vocalizations.

== Taxonomy ==
The Lemon-rumped Warbler was once grouped with the Sichuan Leaf Warbler (Phylloscopus forresti) and was previously classified within P. proregulus. Vocal and genetic studies confirmed its separation as a distinct species. Related taxa in China, including P. kansuensis and P. yunnanensis, are also now recognized as separate.

== Description ==
The Lemon-rumped Warbler is 9–10 cm long and weighs about 4.6–5.1 g. It has a whitish crown stripe bordered by darker olive-brown sides, a pale line above the eye, and a dark eyestripe that often curves downward. The upperparts are greenish-grey, and the rump is yellowish or whitish, which gives the species its name. The wings are grey-brown with green edging and usually show one or two pale wingbars. The underparts are whitish or buff with some grey along the breast sides. The bill is dark with a yellowish or orange base to the lower mandible, and the legs are dark grey. Males and females are similar, though females are slightly smaller. Juveniles resemble adults. Two subspecies are recognized: one in the central and eastern Himalayas and another in the west, which shows greener and more buff-toned plumage.

== Distribution and habitat ==
The species breeds across the Himalayas from northern Pakistan through Nepal into India, Bhutan, and China. In winter, it descends to lower elevations, reaching Assam and occasionally Myanmar, though its presence in Afghanistan is uncertain. It inhabits montane forests between 2 200 and 4 200 meters above sea level. In Pakistan it is most frequent at elevations of 2 200–2 700 m, while in Nepal it ranges up to 4 000 m. Winter records occur from 300–2 700 m, generally above 1 000 m. Breeding habitat includes spruce and fir forests with rhododendron and broadleaf trees, as well as oak and lower-elevation broadleaf stands near the conifer zone.

== Behavior ==
=== Movements ===
The species makes altitudinal movements, breeding higher in summer and descending to lower elevations in winter.

=== Feeding ===
Its diet consists mainly of insects and larvae. It forages alone or in pairs in winter but also joins mixed-species flocks. Foraging occurs in the canopy and understory, often involving short hovering or sallies to catch prey in the air—a behavior known as flycatching.

=== Vocalizations ===
Two song types are reported: a short trill followed by a lower trill lasting 2–4 seconds, and a longer, varied series of notes that may last several minutes. The call is a sharp, high “pist” or “psit.”

=== Breeding ===
Breeding occurs from April to July, with the majority of activity taking place in May and June. The nest is a ball-shaped structure with a side entrance, built by the female from grass, moss, lichen, and birch bark, and lined with feathers. Nests are placed 2–15 m above the ground, usually in conifers. Clutches contain 3–5 eggs, most often four. The female incubates the eggs, and both adults feed the young.

== Conservation ==
The Lemon-rumped Warbler is assessed as Least Concern on the IUCN Red List. It is widespread across the Himalayas with stable populations. Much of its range lies within protected areas, and no major threats are currently reported. Localized logging or habitat alteration may affect populations, but the species is able to adapt to a range of montane forests.
