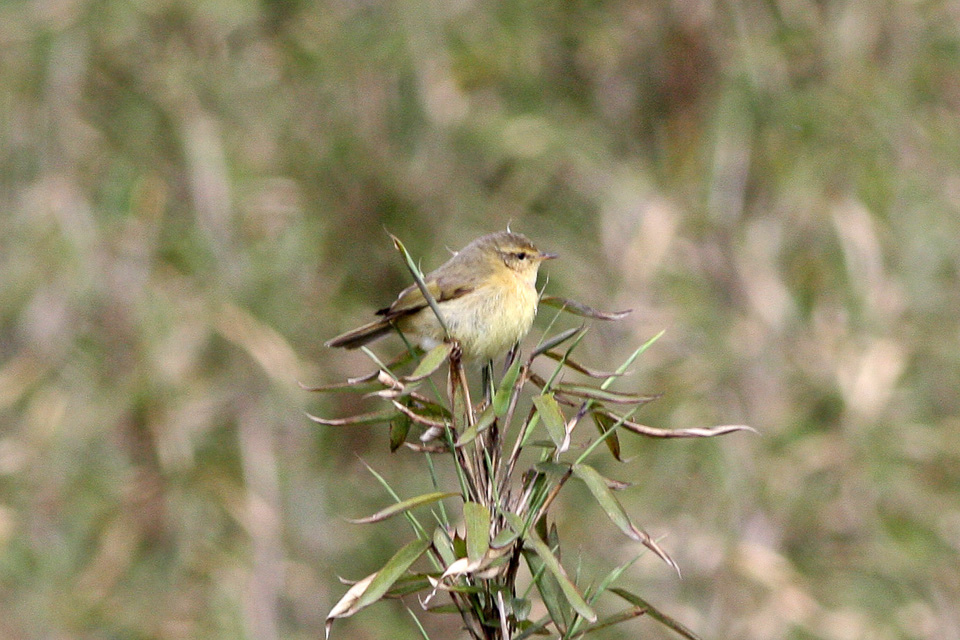

Conservation status
- Least Concern (IUCN 3.1)

Scientific classification
- Kingdom: Animalia
- Phylum: Chordata
- Class: Aves
- Order: Passeriformes
- Family: Phylloscopidae
- Genus: Phylloscopus
- Species: P. subaffinis

Binomial name
- Phylloscopus subaffinis Ogilvie-Grant, 1900
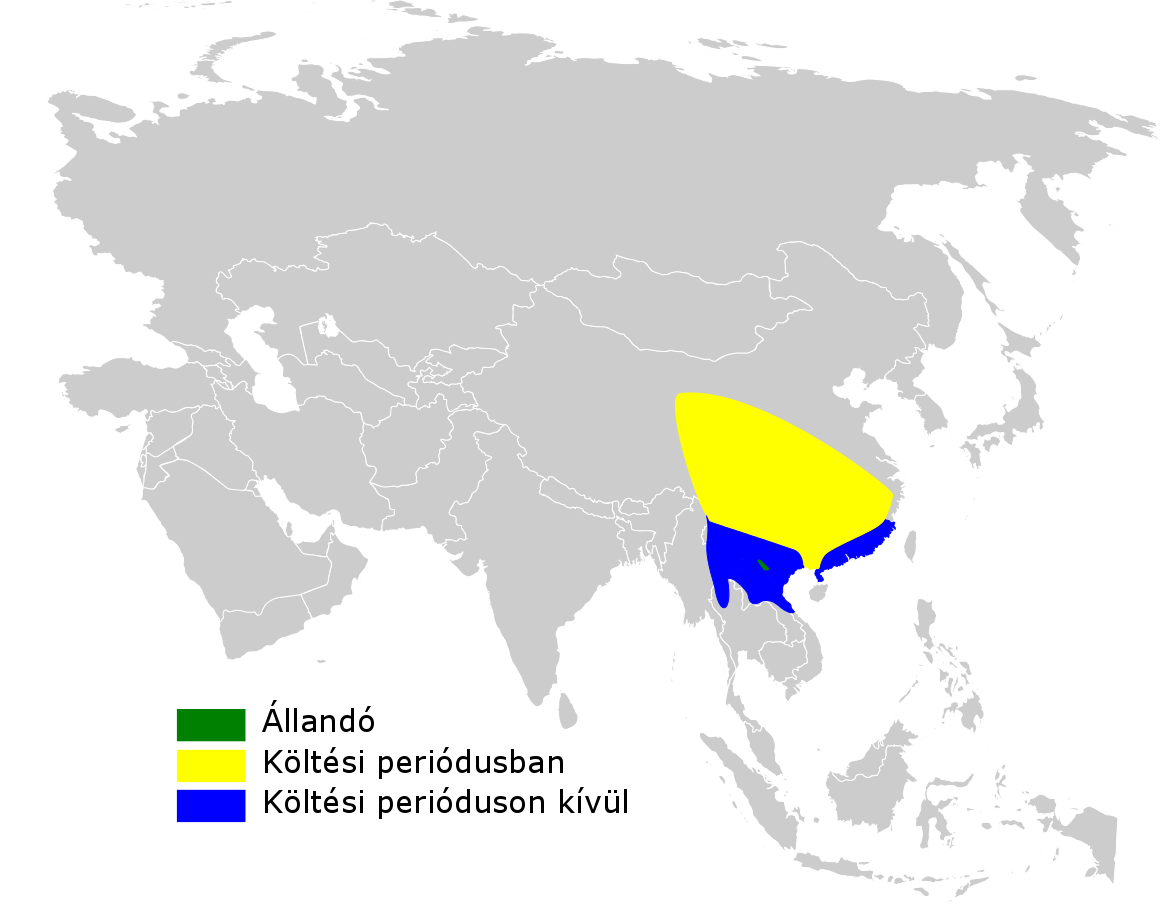
- Year-round Breeding Non-breeding

= Buff-throated warbler =

Species of bird

The buff-throated warbler (Phylloscopus subaffinis) is a species of leaf warbler (family Phylloscopidae). It was formerly included in the "Old World warbler" assemblage.

It breeds in China and winters down toward northern Southeast Asia. Its natural habitat is temperate forests.

== Description ==
Its underparts are yellowish, and its upperparts are greenish-gray. Its bill has a dark tip. It is similar to Tickell's leaf warbler, but duller in color.

== Vocalization ==
It can be identified by its short two-note call.

== Diet ==
It forages in low vegetation.

== Breeding ==
It breeds on hillsides in open scrub habitat.
