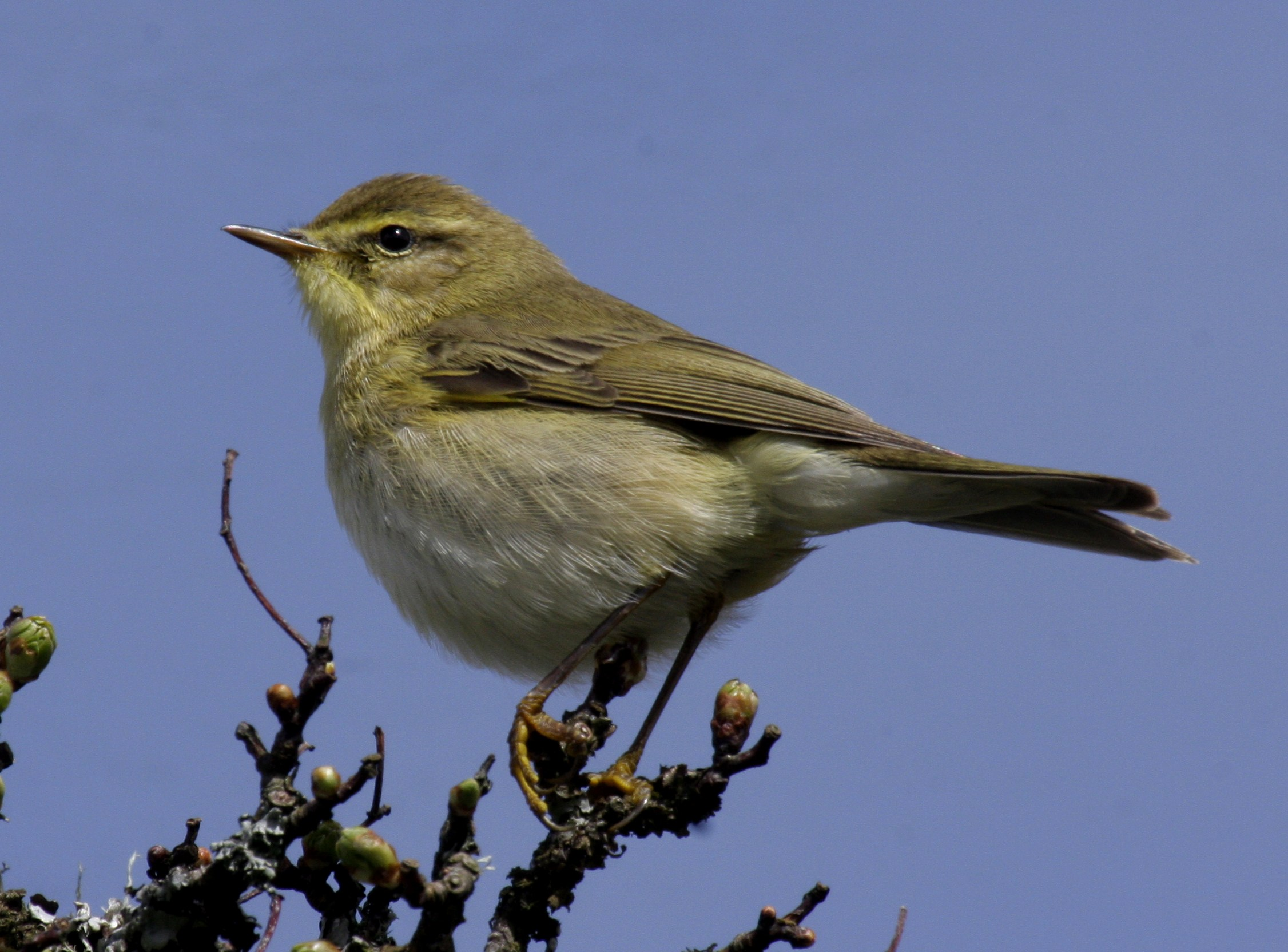
- Willow warbler (Phylloscopus trochilus)

Scientific classification
- Kingdom: Animalia
- Phylum: Chordata
- Class: Aves
- Order: Passeriformes
- Superfamily: Aegithaloidea
- Family: Phylloscopidae; Alström, Ericson, Olsson, & Sundberg, 2006
- Genus: Phylloscopus; F. Boie, 1826

Type species
- Sylvia trochilus = Motacilla trochilus Latham, 1790

Species
- See text

= Leaf warbler =

Leaf warblers

Genus of birds

Leaf warblers are small insectivorous passerine birds belonging to the genus Phylloscopus.

Leaf warblers were formerly included in the Old World warbler family but are now considered to belong to the family Phylloscopidae, introduced in 2006. The family originally included the genus Seicercus, but all species have been moved to Phylloscopus in the most recent classification. Leaf warblers are active, constantly moving, often flicking their wings as they glean the foliage for insects along the branches of trees and bushes. They forage at various levels within forests, from the top canopy to the understorey. Most of the species are markedly territorial both in their summer and winter quarters. Most are greenish or brownish above and off-white or yellowish below. Compared to some other "warblers", their songs are very simple. Species breeding in temperate regions are usually strongly migratory.

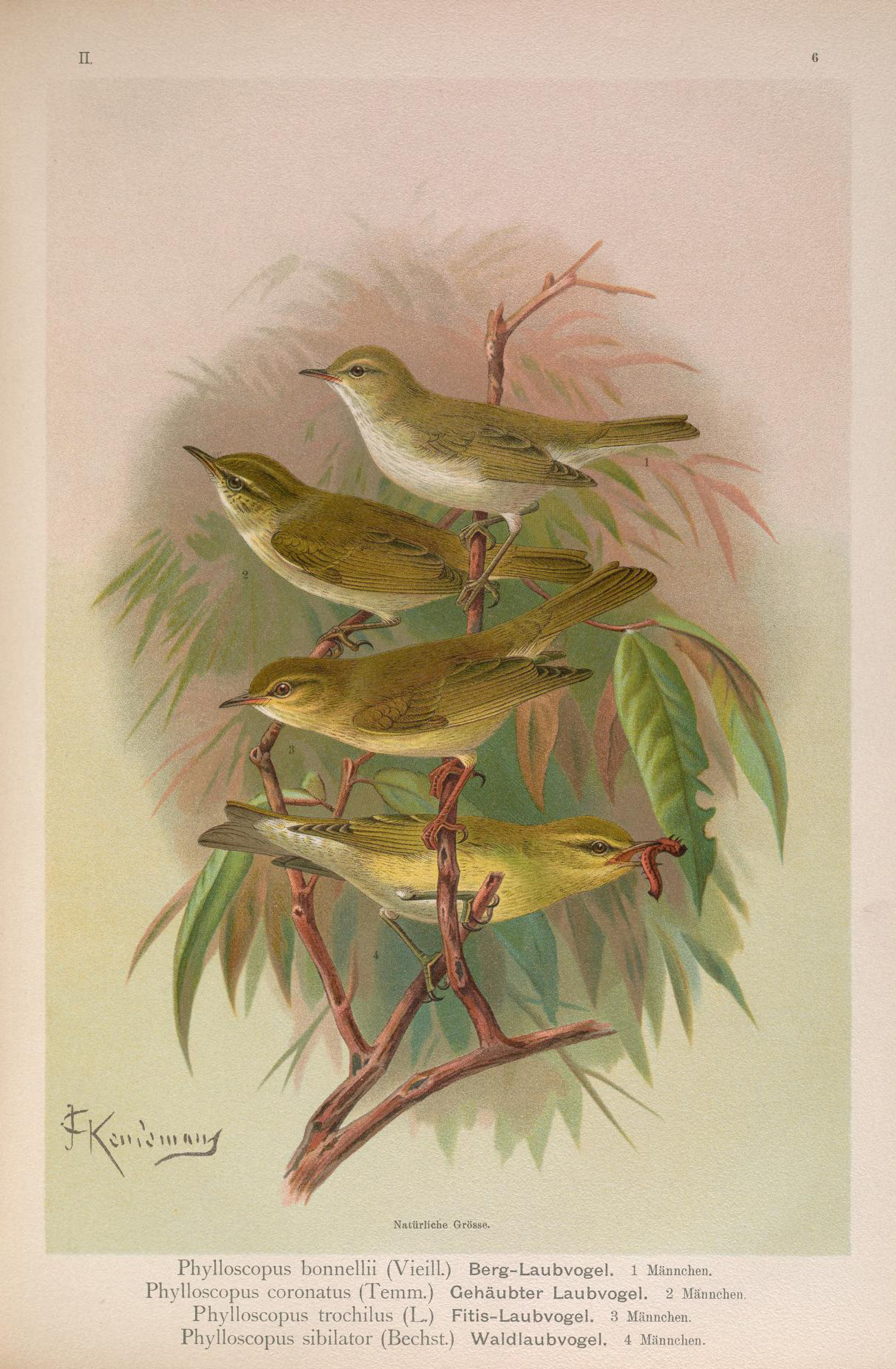
Illustration of Phylloscopus bonelli, Phylloscopus coronatus, Phylloscopus trochilus, Phylloscopus sibilatrix by John Gerrard Keulemans

== Description ==
The species are of various sizes, often green-plumaged above and yellow below, or more subdued with greyish-green to greyish-brown colours, varying little or not at all with the seasons. The tails are not very long and contain 12 feathers (unlike the similar Abroscopus species, which have 10 tail feathers). Many species are more easily identified by their distinctive songs than their dull plumage. These are very small passerines with adult body masses that can vary from 3.5 to 17 g (0.12 to 0.60 oz) and in some cases, such as the Chinese leaf warbler, are among the lightest passerines anywhere. Several of the larger species are similar in size including the large-billed leaf warbler, Radde's warbler and the pale-legged leaf warbler. Total length can vary from 9 to 14.5 cm (3.5 to 5.7 in).

== Distribution and habitat ==
Its members occur in Eurasia, ranging into Wallacea and Africa with one species, the Arctic warbler, breeding as far east as Alaska. Many of the species breed at temperate and high latitudes in Eurasia and migrate substantial distances to winter in southeastern Asia, India, or Africa. One example is Tickell's leaf warbler, which breeds in scrub at high elevation in the Himalayas and on the Tibetan Plateau and then moves down-slope and south to winter in the Himalayan foothills of India and Burma. Most live in forest and scrub and many are canopy or sub-canopy dwellers.

== Behavior and ecology ==
The family Phylloscopidae comprises many small tree-loving warbler species that feed by gleaning insects from leaves or catching food on the wing.

== Taxonomy ==
The genus Phylloscopus was introduced by the German zoologist Friedrich Boie in 1826 to accommodate a single species, the willow warbler, which is therefore considered as the type species. The name combines the Ancient Greek phullon meaning "leaf" and skopos meaning "seeker" (from skopeo, "to watch"). Phylloscopus is the only genus placed in the family Phylloscopidae. The family was introduced in 2006 by the Swedish ornithologist Per Alström and coworkers.

The following cladogram showing the family relationships is based on a study by Carl Oliveros and colleagues published in 2019. The number of species is taken from the Avilist taxonomy.

- - Aegithaloidea
    - - Phylloscopidae – leaf warblers (80 species)
      - - Hyliidae – hylias (2 species)
        - - Aegithalidae – bushtits (11 species)
          - - Erythrocercidae – flycatchers (3 species)
            - - Scotocercidae – streaked scrub warbler
              - Cettiidae – bush warblers and allies (32 species)

The genus contains 80 species. Of these, eleven were formerly placed in the genus Seicercus, but when a 2018 molecular phylogeny study found that Seicercus was embedded in Phylloscopus, the two genera were merged leaving the family Phylloscopidae with a single genus, Phylloscopus.

Image	Common name	Scientific name
	Wood warbler	Phylloscopus sibilatrix
	Western Bonelli's warbler	Phylloscopus bonelli
	Eastern Bonelli's warbler	Phylloscopus orientalis
	Buff-barred warbler	Phylloscopus pulcher
	Ashy-throated warbler	Phylloscopus maculipennis
	Hume's leaf warbler	Phylloscopus humei
	Yellow-browed warbler	Phylloscopus inornatus
	Brooks's leaf warbler	Phylloscopus subviridis
	Chinese leaf warbler	Phylloscopus yunnanensis
	Lemon-rumped warbler	Phylloscopus chloronotus
	Sichuan leaf warbler	Phylloscopus forresti
	Gansu leaf warbler	Phylloscopus kansuensis
	Pallas's leaf warbler	Phylloscopus proregulus
	Tytler's leaf warbler	Phylloscopus tytleri
	Yellow-streaked warbler	Phylloscopus armandii
	Radde's warbler	Phylloscopus schwarzi
	Sulphur-bellied warbler	Phylloscopus griseolus
	Tickell's leaf warbler	Phylloscopus affinis (includes the alpine leaf warbler, P. a. occisinensis)
	Smoky warbler	Phylloscopus fuligiventer
	Dusky warbler	Phylloscopus fuscatus
	Plain leaf warbler	Phylloscopus neglectus
	Buff-throated warbler	Phylloscopus subaffinis
	Willow warbler	Phylloscopus trochilus
	Mountain chiffchaff	Phylloscopus sindianus
	Canary Islands chiffchaff: Eastern Canary Islands chiffchaff; Western Canary Islands chiffchaff	Phylloscopus canariensis: Phylloscopus canariensis exsul (extinct: 1986?); Phylloscopus canariensis canariensis
	Common chiffchaff	Phylloscopus collybita
	Iberian chiffchaff	Phylloscopus ibericus
	Eastern crowned warbler	Phylloscopus coronatus
	Ijima's leaf warbler	Phylloscopus ijimae
	Tokara leaf warbler	Phylloscopus tokaraensis
	Philippine leaf warbler	Phylloscopus olivaceus
	Lemon-throated leaf warbler	Phylloscopus cebuensis
	Yellow-throated woodland warbler	Phylloscopus ruficapilla
	Brown woodland warbler	Phylloscopus umbrovirens
	Red-faced woodland warbler	Phylloscopus laetus
	Laura's woodland warbler	Phylloscopus laurae
	Black-capped woodland warbler	Phylloscopus herberti
	Uganda woodland warbler	Phylloscopus budongoensis
	White-spectacled warbler	Phylloscopus intermedius – (previously Seicercus affinis)
	Grey-cheeked warbler	Phylloscopus poliogenys – (previously placed in Seicercus)
	Green-crowned warbler	Phylloscopus burkii – (previously placed in Seicercus)
	Grey-crowned warbler	Phylloscopus tephrocephalus – (previously placed in Seicercus)
	Whistler's warbler	Phylloscopus whistleri – (previously placed in Seicercus)
	Bianchi's warbler	Phylloscopus valentini – (previously placed in Seicercus)
	Alström's warbler	Phylloscopus soror – (first described in 1999; previously placed in Seicercus)
	Martens's warbler	Phylloscopus omeiensis – (first described in 1999; previously placed in Seicercus)
	Green warbler	Phylloscopus nitidus
	Two-barred warbler	Phylloscopus plumbeitarsus
	Greenish warbler	Phylloscopus trochiloides
	Emei leaf warbler	Phylloscopus emeiensis
	Large-billed leaf warbler	Phylloscopus magnirostris
	Sakhalin leaf warbler	Phylloscopus borealoides
	Pale-legged leaf warbler	Phylloscopus tenellipes
	Japanese leaf warbler	Phylloscopus xanthodryas
	Kamchatka leaf warbler	Phylloscopus examinandus
	Arctic warbler	Phylloscopus borealis
	Chestnut-crowned warbler	Phylloscopus castaniceps – (previously placed in Seicercus)
	Sunda warbler	Phylloscopus grammiceps – (previously placed in Seicercus)
	Yellow-breasted warbler	Phylloscopus montis – (previously placed in Seicercus)
	Limestone leaf warbler	Phylloscopus calciatilis – (first described in 2010)
	Sulphur-breasted warbler	Phylloscopus ricketti
	Yellow-vented warbler	Phylloscopus cantator
	Western crowned warbler	Phylloscopus occipitalis
	Blyth's leaf warbler	Phylloscopus reguloides
	Claudia's leaf warbler	Phylloscopus claudiae
	Hartert's leaf warbler	Phylloscopus goodsoni
	Kloss's leaf warbler	Phylloscopus ogilviegranti – (formerly a subspecies of Davison's leaf warbler)
	Hainan leaf warbler	Phylloscopus hainanus
	Davison's leaf warbler	Phylloscopus intensior – (previously white-tailed leaf warbler, Phylloscopus davisoni)
	Grey-hooded warbler	Phylloscopus xanthoschistos
	Mountain leaf warbler	Phylloscopus trivirgatus
	Negros leaf warbler	Phylloscopus nigrorum
	Timor leaf warbler	Phylloscopus presbytes – (includes Flores leaf warbler as a subspecies)
	Rote leaf warbler	Phylloscopus rotiensis (first described in 2018)
	Makira leaf warbler	Phylloscopus makirensis
	Sulawesi leaf warbler	Phylloscopus nesophilus – (formerly a subspecies of Lompobattang leaf warbler)
	Lompobattang leaf warbler	Phylloscopus sarasinorum
	Kolombangara leaf warbler	Phylloscopus amoenus
	Island leaf warbler	Phylloscopus poliocephalus (includes Peleng and Taliabu leaf warblers that were first described in 2020)
	Numfor leaf warbler	Phylloscopus maforensis
	Biak leaf warbler	Phylloscopus misoriensis
