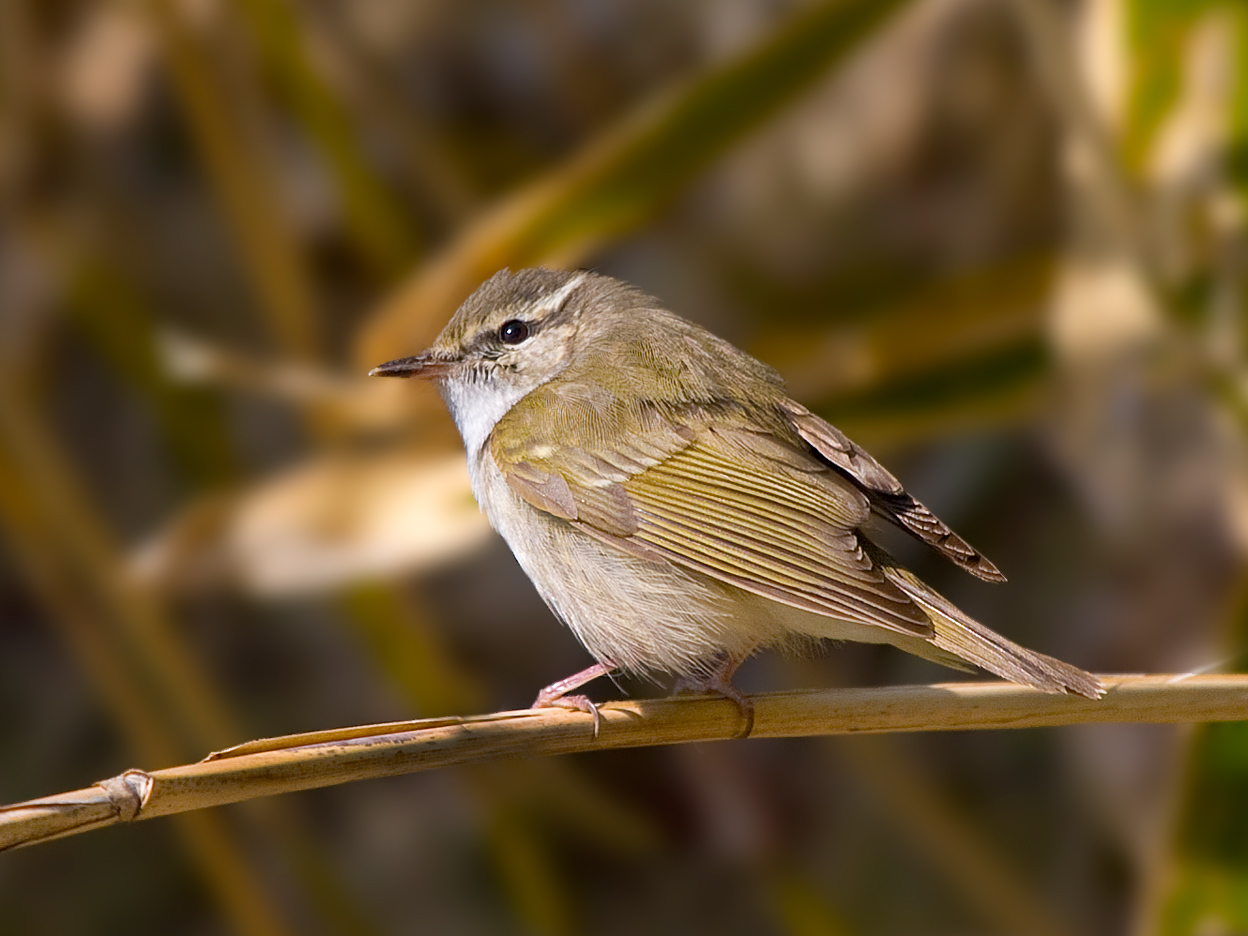

Conservation status
- Least Concern (IUCN 3.1)

Scientific classification
- Kingdom: Animalia
- Phylum: Chordata
- Class: Aves
- Order: Passeriformes
- Family: Phylloscopidae
- Genus: Phylloscopus
- Species: P. borealoides

Binomial name
- Phylloscopus borealoides Portenko, 1950

= Sakhalin leaf warbler =

Species of bird

The Sakhalin leaf warbler (Phylloscopus borealoides) is a species of Old World warbler in the family Phylloscopidae. It is found in Sakhalin, the Kuril Islands and Japan; it winters to the Amami and Okinawa islands and Indochina.

Its natural habitat is temperate forests.

== Description ==
It has a long white supercilium and broad, dark brown eye-stripes. Its crown, upper parts, and bill are also dark brown. It has greenish-brown cheeks and its ear-coverts are mottled. Its bill has a pink base that extends to the lower mandible. Its legs are pale pinkish-brown.

It is easily confused with the pale-legged leaf warbler. One possible distinguishing feature is that its upperparts are slightly more greenish. It is more easily distinguished by its lower-pitched vocalizations, but some overlap does exist in the species' pitch ranges.

== Breeding ==
It nests in shrubs.
