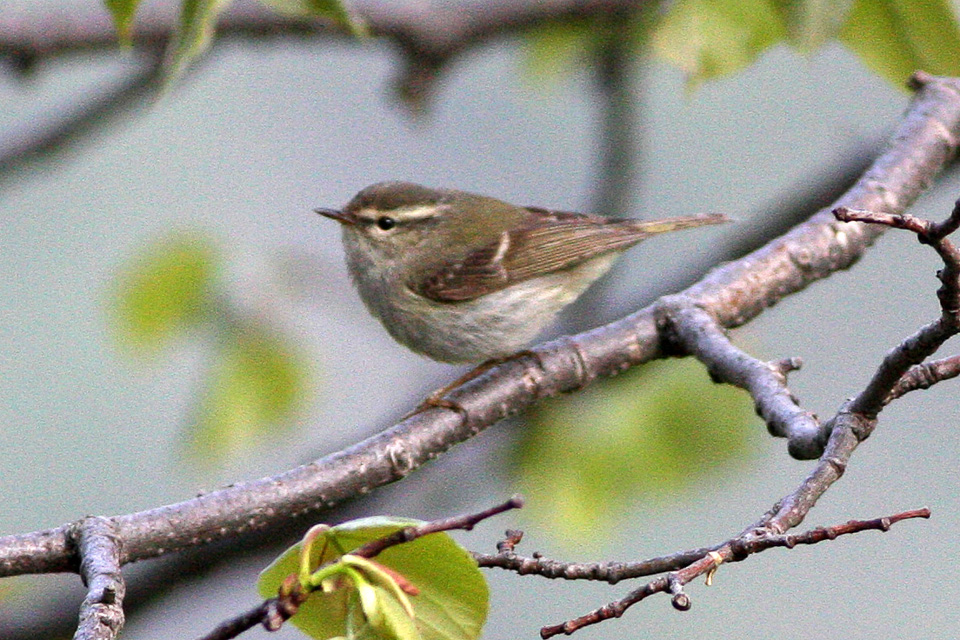
- At Taibai Shan, Shanxi, China

Conservation status
- Least Concern (IUCN 3.1)

Scientific classification
- Kingdom: Animalia
- Phylum: Chordata
- Class: Aves
- Order: Passeriformes
- Family: Phylloscopidae
- Genus: Phylloscopus
- Species: P. yunnanensis

Binomial name
- Phylloscopus yunnanensis La Touche, 1922

Synonyms
- Phylloscopus sichuanensis

= Chinese leaf warbler =

Species of bird

The Chinese leaf warbler (Phylloscopus yunnanensis) is a species of Old World warbler in the family Phylloscopidae. Its natural habitats are subtropical or tropical dry forests and subtropical or tropical high-altitude shrubland. It is found only in China.

== Etymology ==
The Chinese leaf warbler's scientific binomial name, Phylloscopus yunnanensis, originates from the Irish ornithological naturalist authority John David Digues La Touche in 1922. A more recent Latin "junior synonym" alternate scientific name is P. sichuanensis from 1992. Yunnanensis and sichuanensis derive from the Yunnan and Sichuan provinces in China.

== Description ==
The Chinese leaf warbler is a brightly colored, small leaf-warbler, with a total length of around 10 cm and a wing length of 5–6 cm. Its body is slightly elongated and compact. The warbler has a slightly forked or notched tail that is almost square in shape. Its bill is pointed and short (around 1 cm long) and dark brown in color, brownish-yellow on the underside. The wings are very short and rounded, the legs slender and very dark. Claws and toes are dark brownish-grey with dusky buff undersides.

=== Plumage ===
Birds generally go through variations in the appearance of their plumage, depending on the stage in their life, the seasons or nutritional intake. In the spring season, this warbler in its adult phase has a new, fresh, or bright appearance already somewhat dulled. In the adult summer phase its feathers appear worn, or duller.

The sexes are similar in appearance. The Chinese leaf warbler is pale green to olive-green above and has a yellowish-white rump. The head pattern is noticeable and striking in appearance, with a well-defined pale eyebrow stripe, a faint yellow median crown stripe and dusky-olive lateral crown stripes. The tertial feathers are sepia-colored and have whitish tips. The eye is surrounded by a broken eyering; the iris of the eye is dark brown.

== Distribution and habitat ==
The Chinese leaf warbler can be found in confined regions or locations in central and north-eastern China. It is common in Xin Shui, Sichuan Province. The species is migratory, but its wintering grounds are currently unknown.

It inhabits mountainous forests, preferring spruce and fir. It can be found at elevations of 200–2800 m, but usually between 1000 m and 2600 m. This species favors low secondary growth.

== Behavior ==
Chinese leaf warblers can be found singly or in pairs during the breeding season. These birds are generally somewhat bold in personality. They almost always keep to tree canopies, where they feed on insects. Males also sing from the tops of trees.

=== Songs ===
The Chinese leaf warbler has a unique song compared to other species of its genus. The song often lasts over a minute and is dry and monotonous tsiridi repeated five times. The call note is loud and varied, an irregular series of clear scolding whistles of tueet repeated five times, then four series of decreasing lengths, finishing up with another 5-fold note. The last phrase can be a hammering tueet-tuee-tee, with a seven-fold tee. The close-range call is a soft trr-trr.
