= Numfor leaf warbler =

Conservation status
- Near Threatened (IUCN 3.1) e.T103866023A208363875.

Scientific classification
- Kingdom: Animalia
- Phylum: Chordata
- Class: Aves
- Order: Passeriformes
- Family: Phylloscopidae
- Genus: Phylloscopus
- Species: P. maforensis

Binomial name
- Phylloscopus maforensis (Meyer, 1874)

Species of bird

The Numfor leaf warbler (Phylloscopus maforensis) is a species of Old World warbler in the family Phylloscopidae. It is endemic to Numfor in Indonesia.
