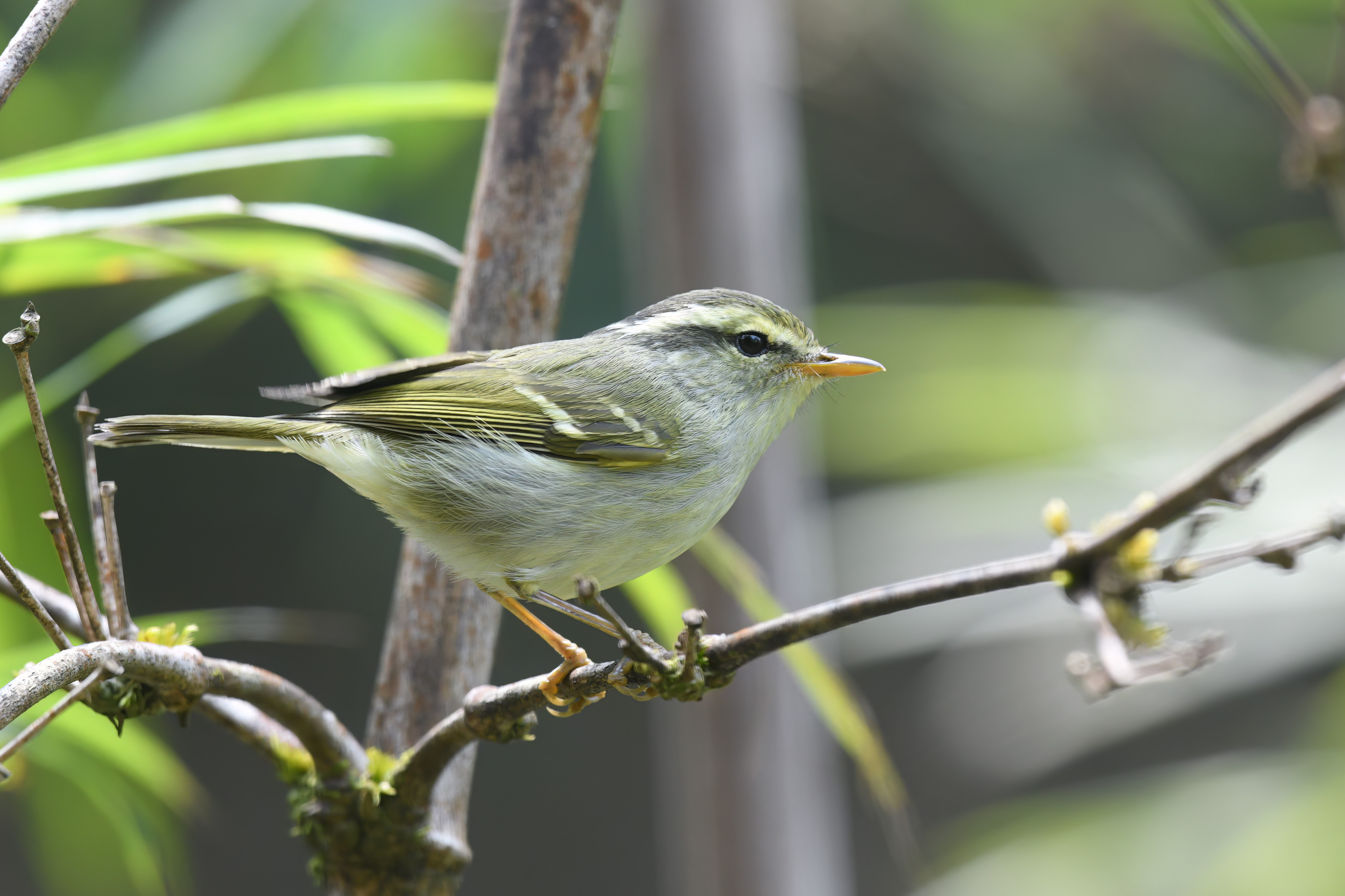
- Davison's leaf warbler

Conservation status
- Least Concern (IUCN 3.1)

Scientific classification
- Kingdom: Animalia
- Phylum: Chordata
- Class: Aves
- Order: Passeriformes
- Family: Phylloscopidae
- Genus: Phylloscopus
- Species: P. intensior

Binomial name
- Phylloscopus intensior Deignan, 1956

Synonyms
- Phylloscopus davisoni (Oates, 1889)

= Davison's leaf warbler =

Species of bird

Davison's leaf warbler (Phylloscopus intensior) or the white-tailed leaf warbler, is a species of leaf warbler (family Phylloscopidae). It was formerly included in the "Old World warbler" assemblage.

It is found in the China, Laos, Myanmar, Thailand, and Vietnam. Its natural habitats are subtropical or tropical moist lowland forest and subtropical or tropical moist montane forest.

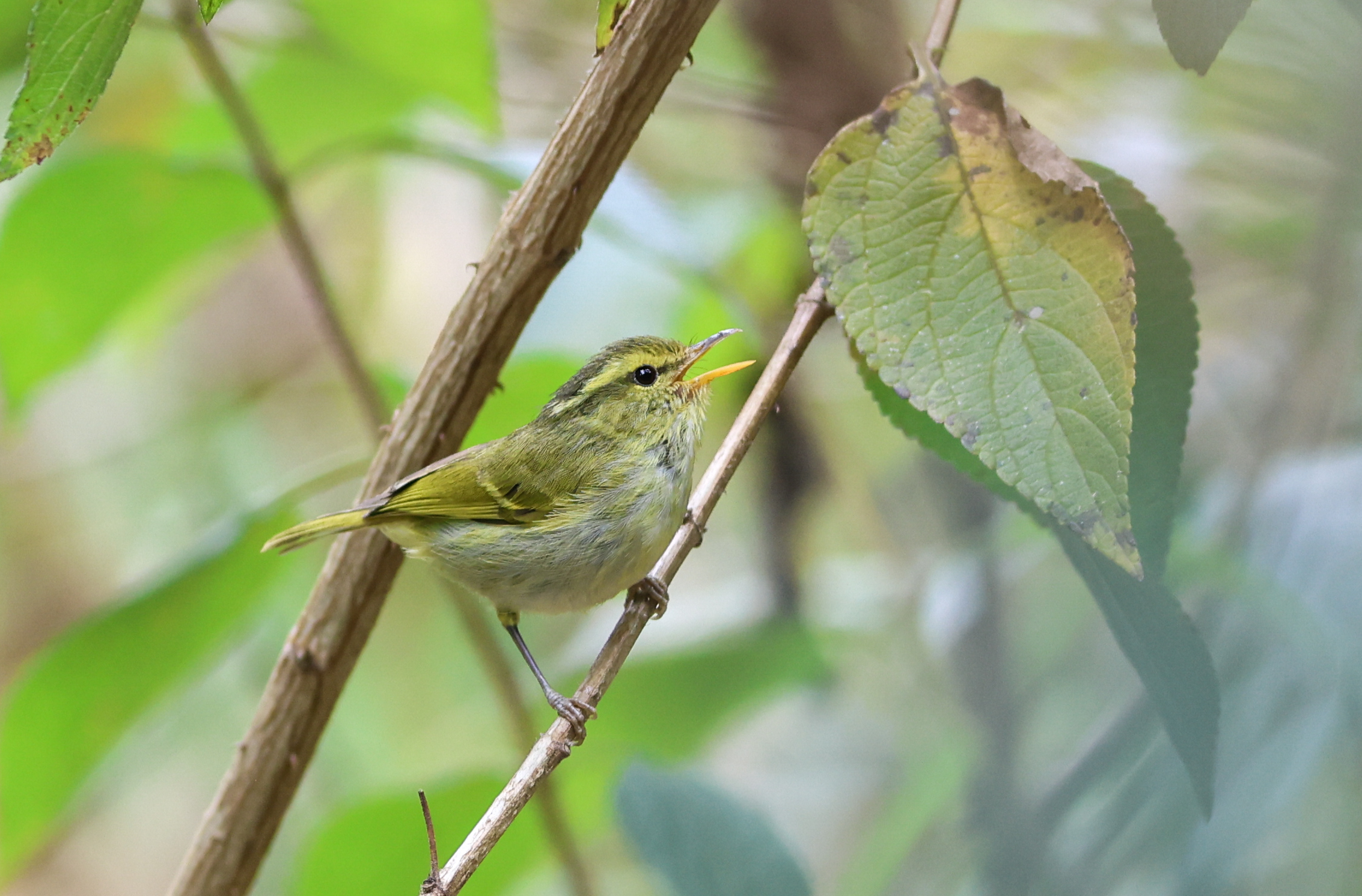
Phylloscopus intensior in South Vietnam

A species from Mount Mulayit called the Tenasserim white-tailed willow warbler (Acanthopneuste davisoni) named after the collector William Ruxton Davison was described by Eugene Oates in 1889. To this species was added a few more subspecies, including disturbans, ogilviegranti, and klossi. Another subspecies was described by the American ornithologist Herbert Girton Deignan in 1956 and given the trinomial name Phylloscopus davisoni intensior. The taxa disturbans, ogilviegranti and klossi were found to form a clade that is sister to P. hainanus. Since ogilviegranti was the first described of the three members of the clade it was elevated to a species and the two others made into subspecies since the sequence differences were small. A study of the mitochondrial DNA sequences and calls suggested that davisoni in the strict sense was a sister of Seicercus xanthoschistos. This left the form intensior which was unrelated and was then elevated as a full species and a second subspecies was added to it, P. i. muleyitensis (Dickinson & Christidis, 2014).
