= Makira leaf warbler =

Conservation status
- Least Concern (IUCN 3.1)

Scientific classification
- Kingdom: Animalia
- Phylum: Chordata
- Class: Aves
- Order: Passeriformes
- Family: Phylloscopidae
- Genus: Phylloscopus
- Species: P. makirensis

Binomial name
- Phylloscopus makirensis Mayr, 1935

Species of bird

The Makira leaf warbler (Phylloscopus makirensis), also known as the San Cristobal leaf-warbler, is a species of Old World warbler in the family Phylloscopidae. It is found only in the Solomon Islands. Its natural habitats are subtropical or tropical moist lowland forests and subtropical or tropical moist montane forests.
