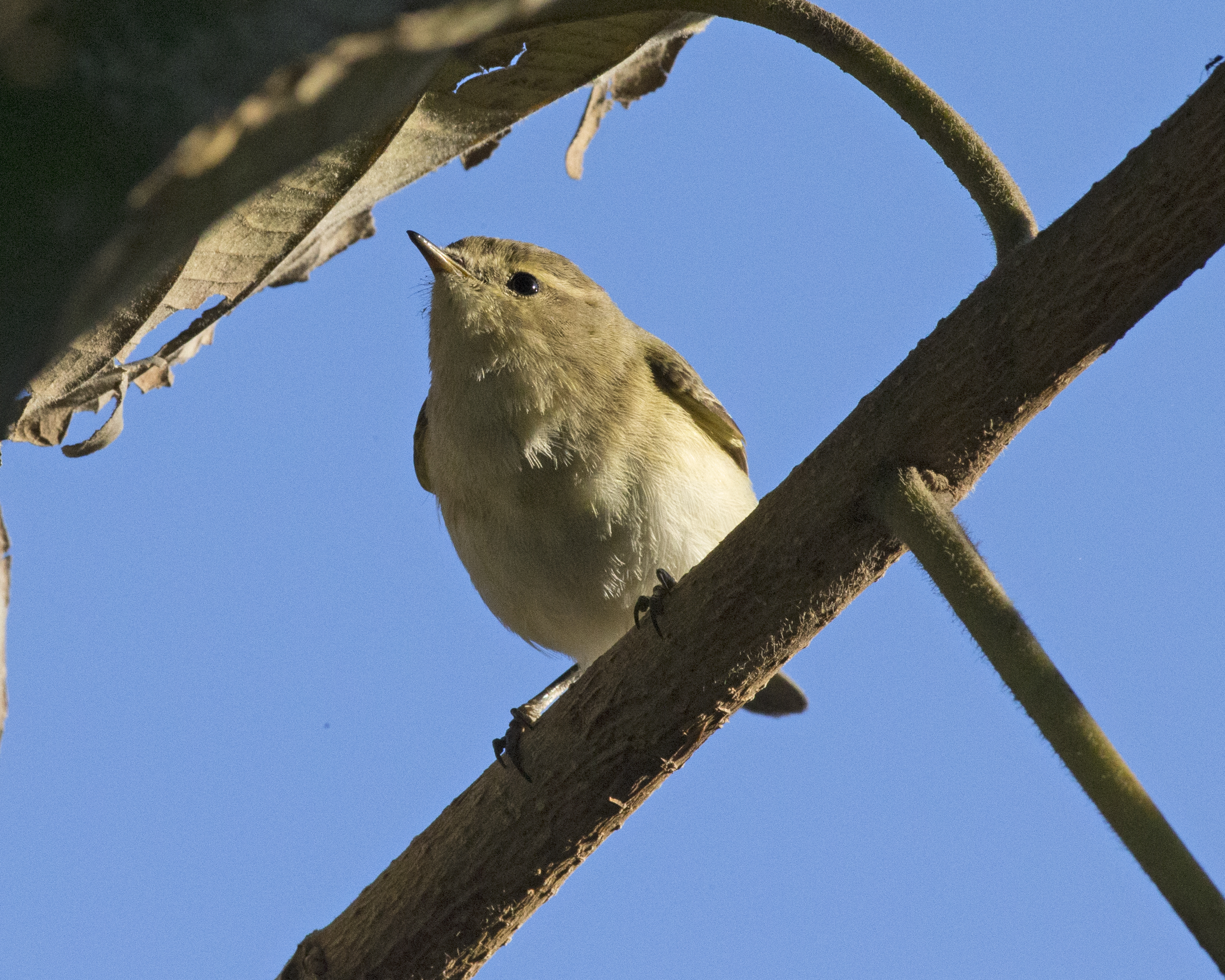
- In Lalibella, Ethiopia

Conservation status
- Least Concern (IUCN 3.1)

Scientific classification
- Kingdom: Animalia
- Phylum: Chordata
- Class: Aves
- Order: Passeriformes
- Family: Phylloscopidae
- Genus: Phylloscopus
- Species: P. umbrovirens

Binomial name
- Phylloscopus umbrovirens (Rüppell, 1840)

Synonyms
- Culicipeta umbrovirens

= Brown woodland warbler =

Species of bird

The brown woodland warbler (Phylloscopus umbrovirens) is a species of Old World warbler in the family Phylloscopidae.

== Distribution and habitat ==
It is native to the eastern Afromontane. Its natural habitats are boreal forests, subtropical or tropical moist montane forests, and subtropical or tropical dry shrubland.

== Status ==
The range of the brown woodland warbler is quite large, with its extent of occurrence being estimated at 3,990,000 km^{2} (1,540,000 sq mi). Its population is assumed to be stable, though no accurate estimates of its size have been made. The 2016 IUCN Red List classifies the species as one of least concern.
