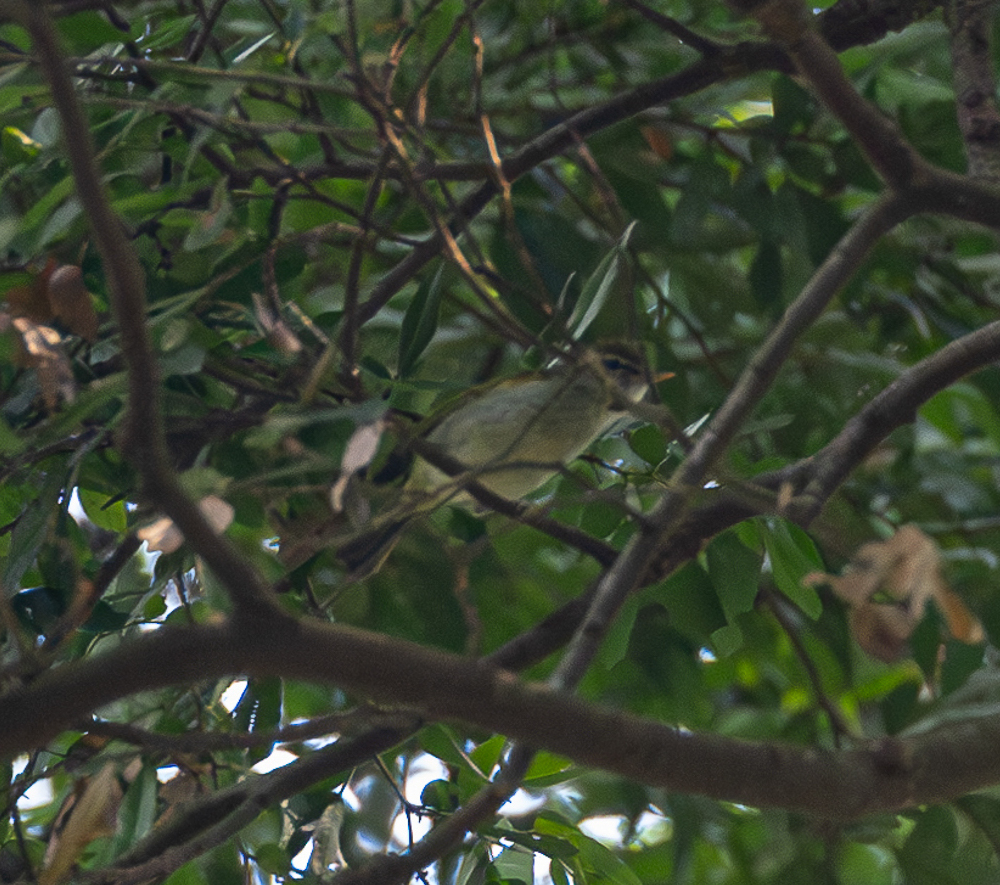

Conservation status
- Least Concern (IUCN 3.1)

Scientific classification
- Kingdom: Animalia
- Phylum: Chordata
- Class: Aves
- Order: Passeriformes
- Family: Phylloscopidae
- Genus: Phylloscopus
- Species: P. budongoensis

Binomial name
- Phylloscopus budongoensis (Seth-Smith, 1907)

= Uganda woodland warbler =

Species of bird

The Uganda woodland warbler (Phylloscopus budongoensis) is a species of Old World warbler in the family Phylloscopidae. It is found in Cameroon, Republic of the Congo, Democratic Republic of the Congo, Equatorial Guinea, Gabon, Kenya, and Uganda.

Its natural habitat is subtropical or tropical moist lowland forests.
