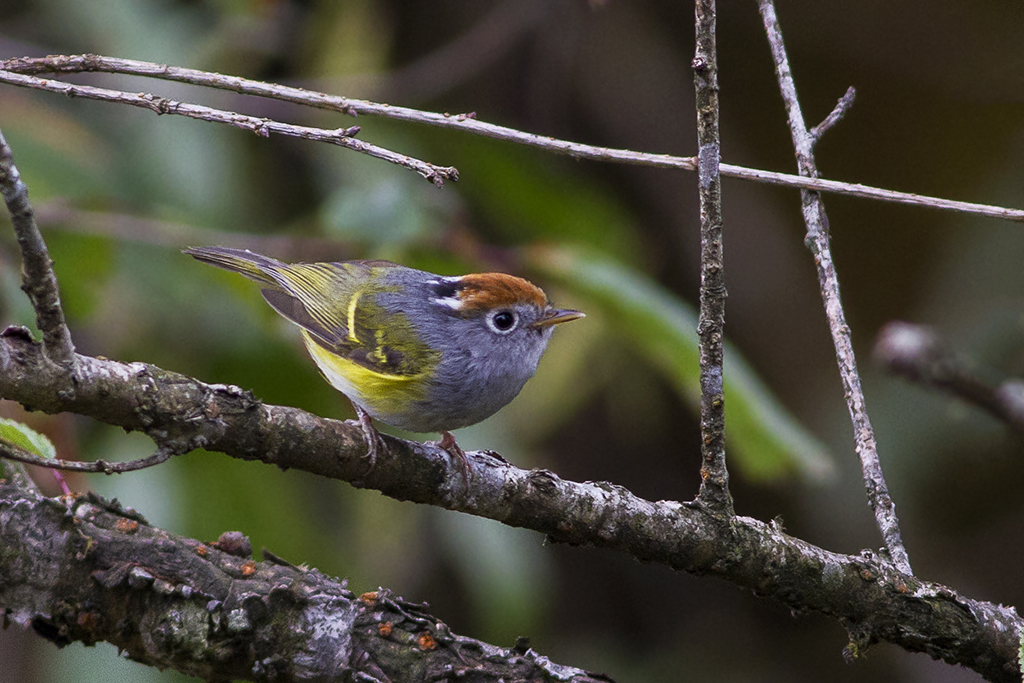
- At Fambong Lho Wildlife Sanctuary, Sikkim, India

Conservation status
- Least Concern (IUCN 3.1)

Scientific classification
- Kingdom: Animalia
- Phylum: Chordata
- Class: Aves
- Order: Passeriformes
- Family: Phylloscopidae
- Genus: Phylloscopus
- Species: P. castaniceps

Binomial name
- Phylloscopus castaniceps (Hodgson, 1845)

Synonyms
- Seicercus castaniceps

= Chestnut-crowned warbler =

Species of bird

The chestnut-crowned warbler (Phylloscopus castaniceps) is a species of leaf warbler (family Phylloscopidae). It was formerly included in the "Old World warbler" assemblage.

It is found in Bangladesh, Bhutan, Cambodia, China, India, Indonesia, Laos, Malaysia, Myanmar, Nepal, Thailand, and Vietnam. Its natural habitats are subtropical or tropical moist lowland forest and subtropical or tropical moist montane forest. Nine subspecies are recognised across its range, and it forms a superspecies with the Sunda warbler and the yellow-breasted warbler.

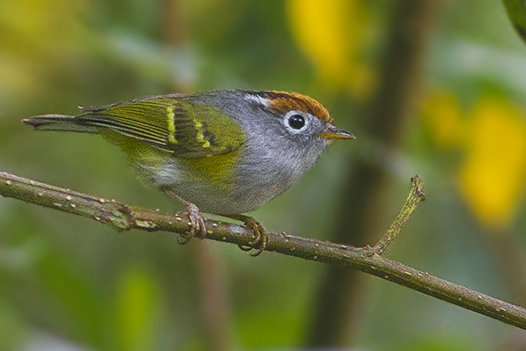
From Khangchendzonga National Park, West Sikkim, India.

It is arboreal and primarily insectivorous. Though not considered migratory, it may make small seasonal movements to higher or lower elevations.

The chestnut-crowned warbler was previously placed in the genus Seicercus. A molecular phylogenetic study published in 2018 found that neither Phylloscopus nor Seicercus were monophyletic. In the subsequent reorganization the two genera were merged into Phylloscopus which has priority under the rules of the International Commission on Zoological Nomenclature.
