= Kolombangara leaf warbler =

Conservation status
- Near Threatened (IUCN 3.1)

Scientific classification
- Kingdom: Animalia
- Phylum: Chordata
- Class: Aves
- Order: Passeriformes
- Family: Phylloscopidae
- Genus: Phylloscopus
- Species: P. amoenus

Binomial name
- Phylloscopus amoenus (Hartert, 1929)

Species of bird

The Kolombangara leaf warbler or sombre leaf warbler (Phylloscopus amoenus) is a species of Old World warbler in the family Phylloscopidae. It is found only in Solomon Islands. Its natural habitat is subtropical or tropical moist montane forests. It is threatened by habitat loss.
