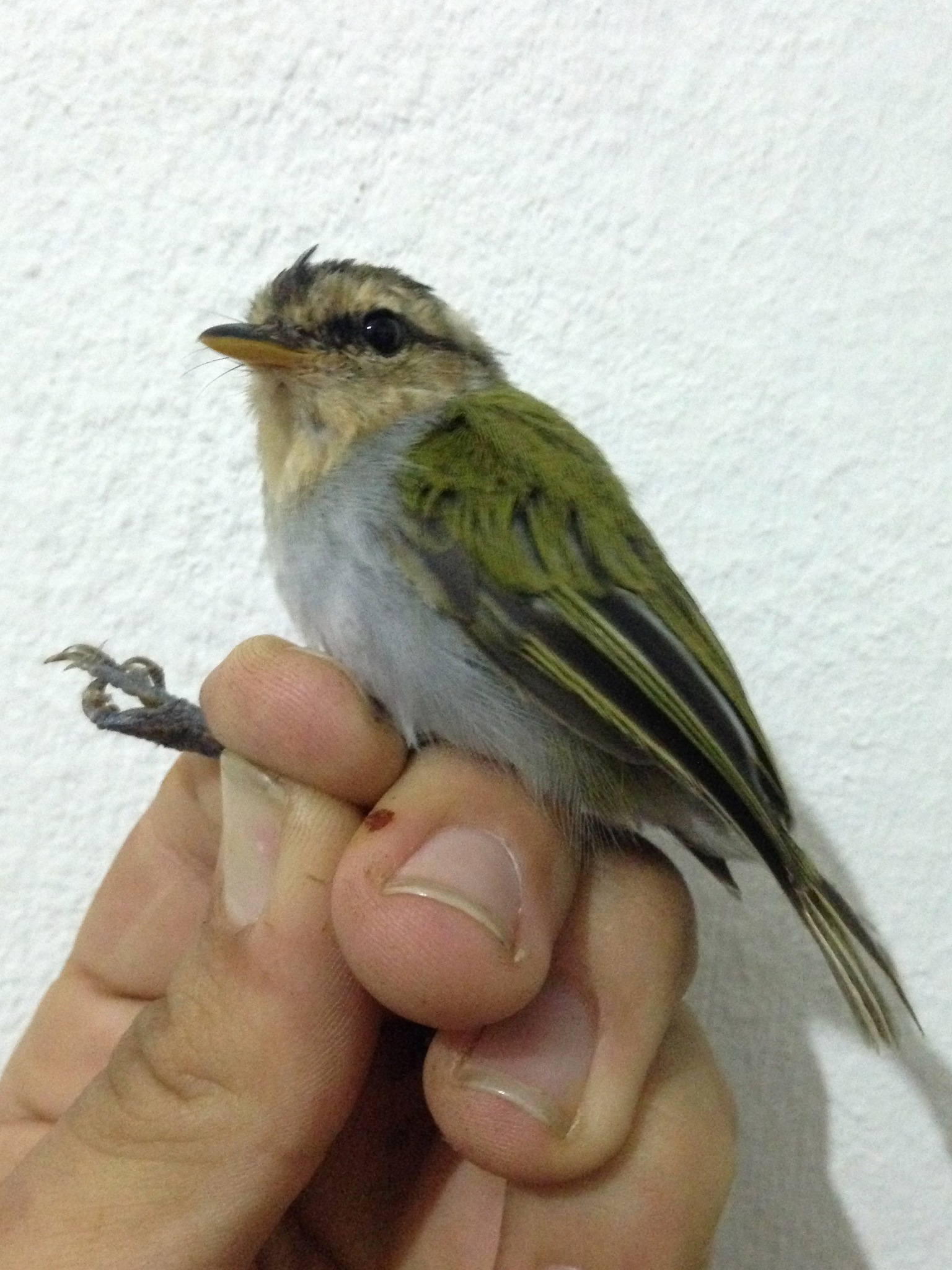

Conservation status
- Least Concern (IUCN 3.1)

Scientific classification
- Kingdom: Animalia
- Phylum: Chordata
- Class: Aves
- Order: Passeriformes
- Family: Phylloscopidae
- Genus: Phylloscopus
- Species: P. herberti

Binomial name
- Phylloscopus herberti (Alexander, 1903)

= Black-capped woodland warbler =

Species of bird

The black-capped woodland warbler (Phylloscopus herberti) is a leaf warbler species in the family Phylloscopidae; it was formerly placed in the "Old World warbler" assemblage.

It is native to the Western High Plateau, Bioko and Equatorial Guinea. Its natural habitat is subtropical or tropical moist montane forests.
