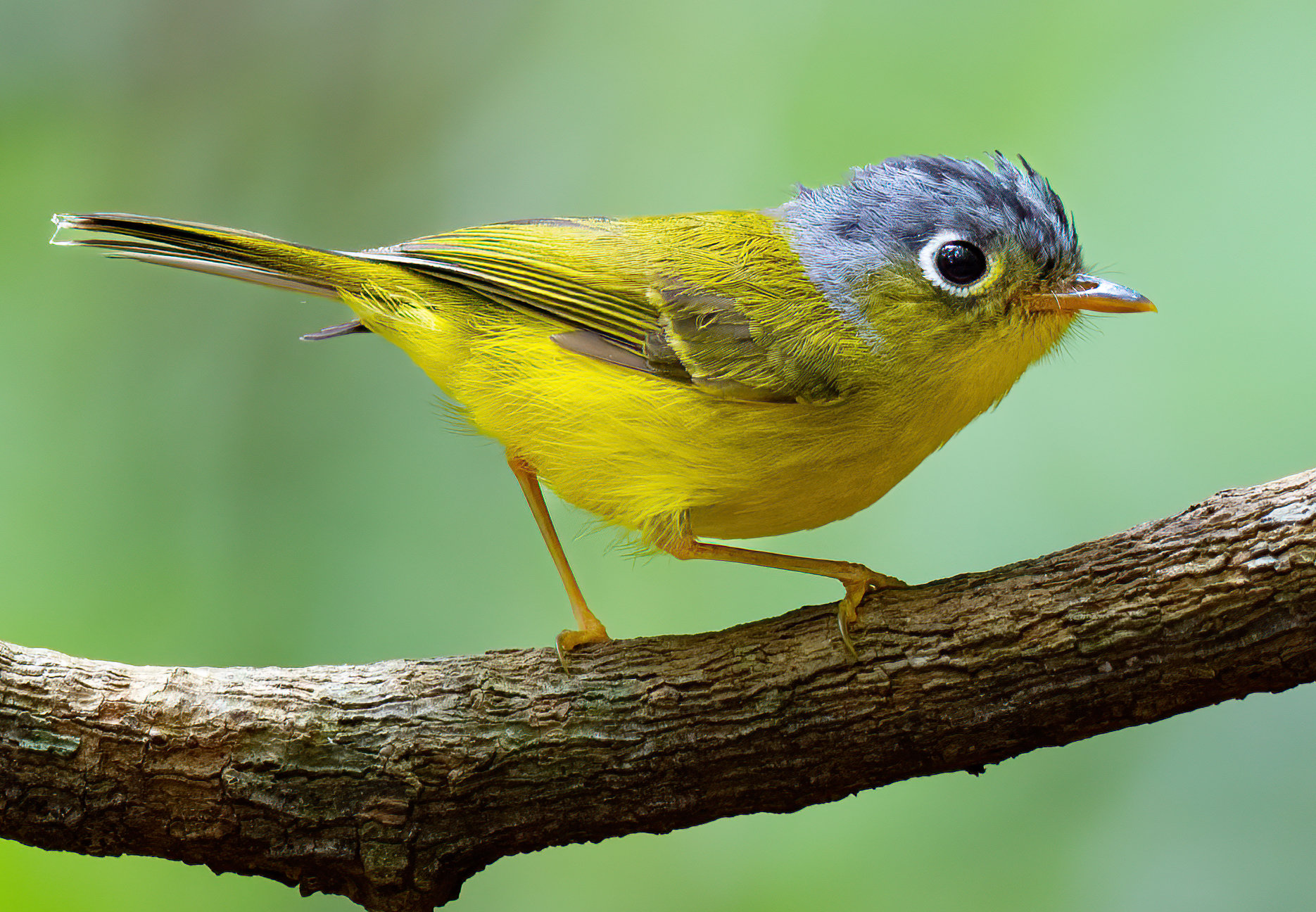

Conservation status
- Least Concern (IUCN 3.1)

Scientific classification
- Kingdom: Animalia
- Phylum: Chordata
- Class: Aves
- Order: Passeriformes
- Family: Phylloscopidae
- Genus: Phylloscopus
- Species: P. poliogenys

Binomial name
- Phylloscopus poliogenys (Blyth, 1847)

Synonyms
- Seicercus poliogenys

= Grey-cheeked warbler =

Species of bird

The grey-cheeked warbler (Phylloscopus poliogenys) is a species of leaf warbler (family Phylloscopidae). It was formerly included in the "Old World warbler" assemblage.

It is native to Bangladesh, Bhutan, China, India, Laos, Myanmar, Nepal, Thailand, and Vietnam. Its natural habitats are subtropical or tropical moist lowland forests and subtropical or tropical moist montane forests. Its population size is unknown, but due to its large range the species does not approach the thresholds for Vulnerable under the range size criteria. The population trend appears to be stable, so also under the population size criteria the species does not approach Vulnerable.

The grey-cheeked warbler was previously placed in the genus Seicercus. A molecular phylogenetic study published in 2018 found that neither Phylloscopus nor Seicercus were monophyletic. In the subsequent reorganization the two genera were merged into Phylloscopus which has priority under the rules of the International Commission on Zoological Nomenclature.
