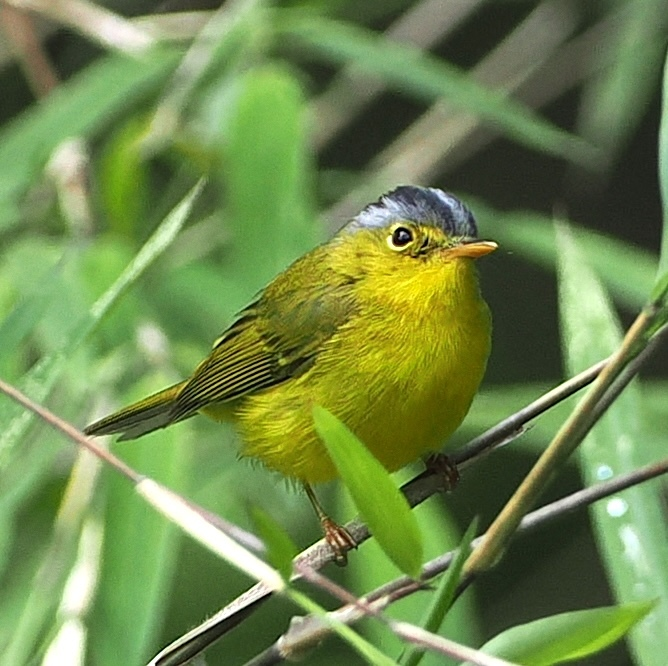

Conservation status
- Least Concern (IUCN 3.1)

Scientific classification
- Kingdom: Animalia
- Phylum: Chordata
- Class: Aves
- Order: Passeriformes
- Family: Phylloscopidae
- Genus: Phylloscopus
- Species: P. tephrocephalus

Binomial name
- Phylloscopus tephrocephalus (Anderson, 1871)

Synonyms
- Seicercus tephrocephalus

= Grey-crowned warbler =

Species of bird

The grey-crowned warbler (Phylloscopus tephrocephalus) is a species of Old World warbler in the family Phylloscopidae. It is found in Bangladesh, China, India, Laos, Myanmar, Thailand and Vietnam. Its natural habitats are temperate forests, subtropical or tropical moist lowland forest, and subtropical or tropical moist montane forest.

The grey-crowned warbler was previously placed in the genus Seicercus. However, a molecular phylogenetic study published in 2018 found that neither Phylloscopus nor Seicercus were monophyletic. In the subsequent reorganization, the two genera were merged into Phylloscopus, which has priority under the rules of the International Commission on Zoological Nomenclature.
