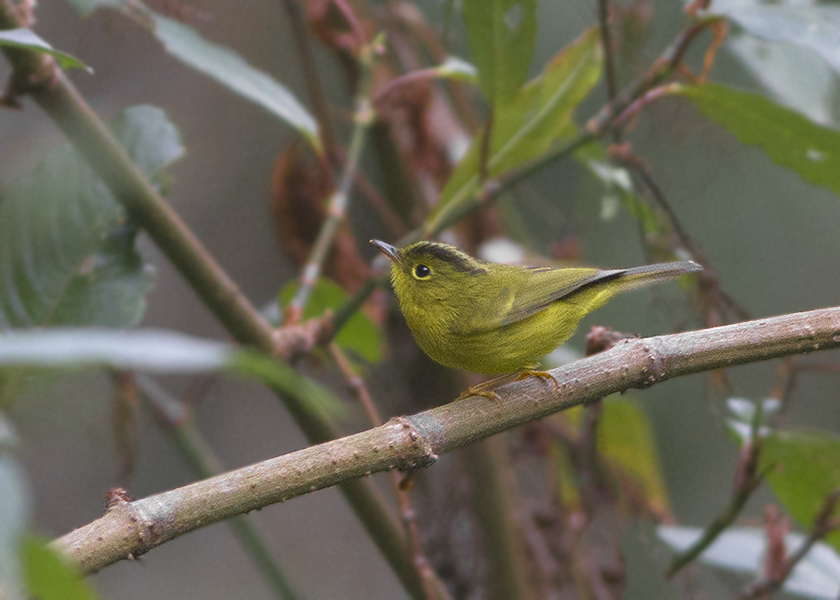
- From Neora Valley National Park, West Bengal, India

Conservation status
- Least Concern (IUCN 3.1)

Scientific classification
- Kingdom: Animalia
- Phylum: Chordata
- Class: Aves
- Order: Passeriformes
- Family: Phylloscopidae
- Genus: Phylloscopus
- Species: P. burkii

Binomial name
- Phylloscopus burkii (Burton, 1836)

Synonyms
- Seicercus burkii

= Green-crowned warbler =

Species of bird

The green-crowned warbler (Phylloscopus burkii) is a species of leaf warbler (family Phylloscopidae). It was formerly included in the "Old World warbler" assemblage.

It is found in the Indian subcontinent, ranging across Bangladesh, Bhutan, India, Nepal, and Pakistan. A single sighting was recorded from Sigiriya, Sri Lanka in 1993. Its natural habitats are subtropical or tropical moist lowland forests and subtropical or tropical moist montane forests.

The green-crowned warbler was previously placed in the genus Seicercus. A molecular phylogenetic study published in 2018 found that neither Phylloscopus nor Seicercus were monophyletic. In the subsequent reorganization the two genera were merged into Phylloscopus which has priority under the rules of the International Commission on Zoological Nomenclature.
