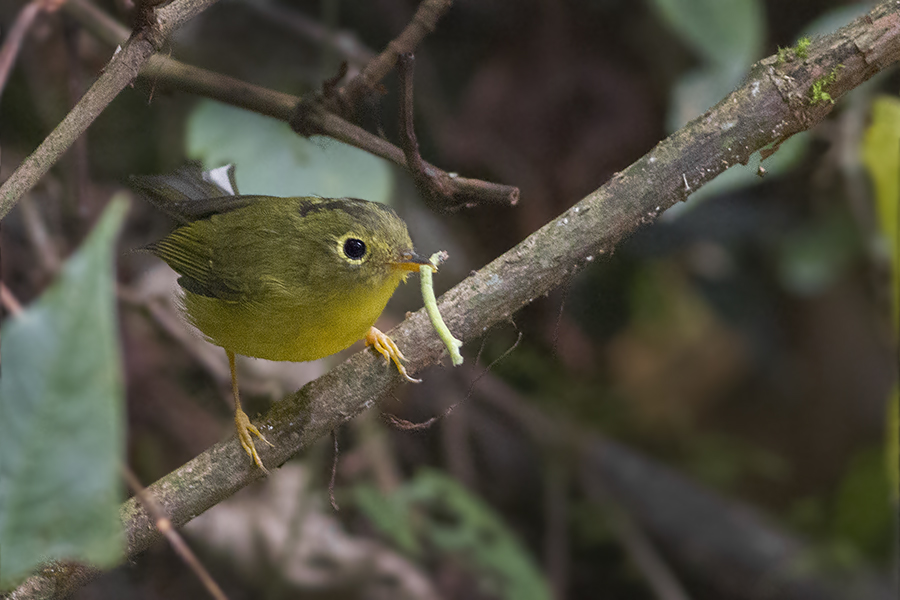
- from Khangchendzonga National Park, West Sikkim, India.

Conservation status
- Least Concern (IUCN 3.1)

Scientific classification
- Kingdom: Animalia
- Phylum: Chordata
- Class: Aves
- Order: Passeriformes
- Family: Phylloscopidae
- Genus: Phylloscopus
- Species: P. whistleri

Binomial name
- Phylloscopus whistleri (Ticehurst, 1925)

Synonyms
- Seicercus whistleri

= Whistler's warbler =

Species of bird

Whistler's warbler (Phylloscopus whistleri) is a species of leaf warbler (family Phylloscopidae). It was formerly included in the "Old World warbler" assemblage.

It is found in the Indian subcontinent, from the Himalayas to Myanmar. Its natural habitats are subtropical or tropical moist montane forests and heavily degraded former forest.

Whistler's warbler was previously placed in the genus Seicercus. A molecular phylogenetic study published in 2018 found that neither Phylloscopus nor Seicercus were monophyletic. In the subsequent reorganization the two genera were merged into Phylloscopus which has priority under the rules of the International Commission on Zoological Nomenclature. The common name commemorates the English ornithologist Hugh Whistler (1889–1943).
