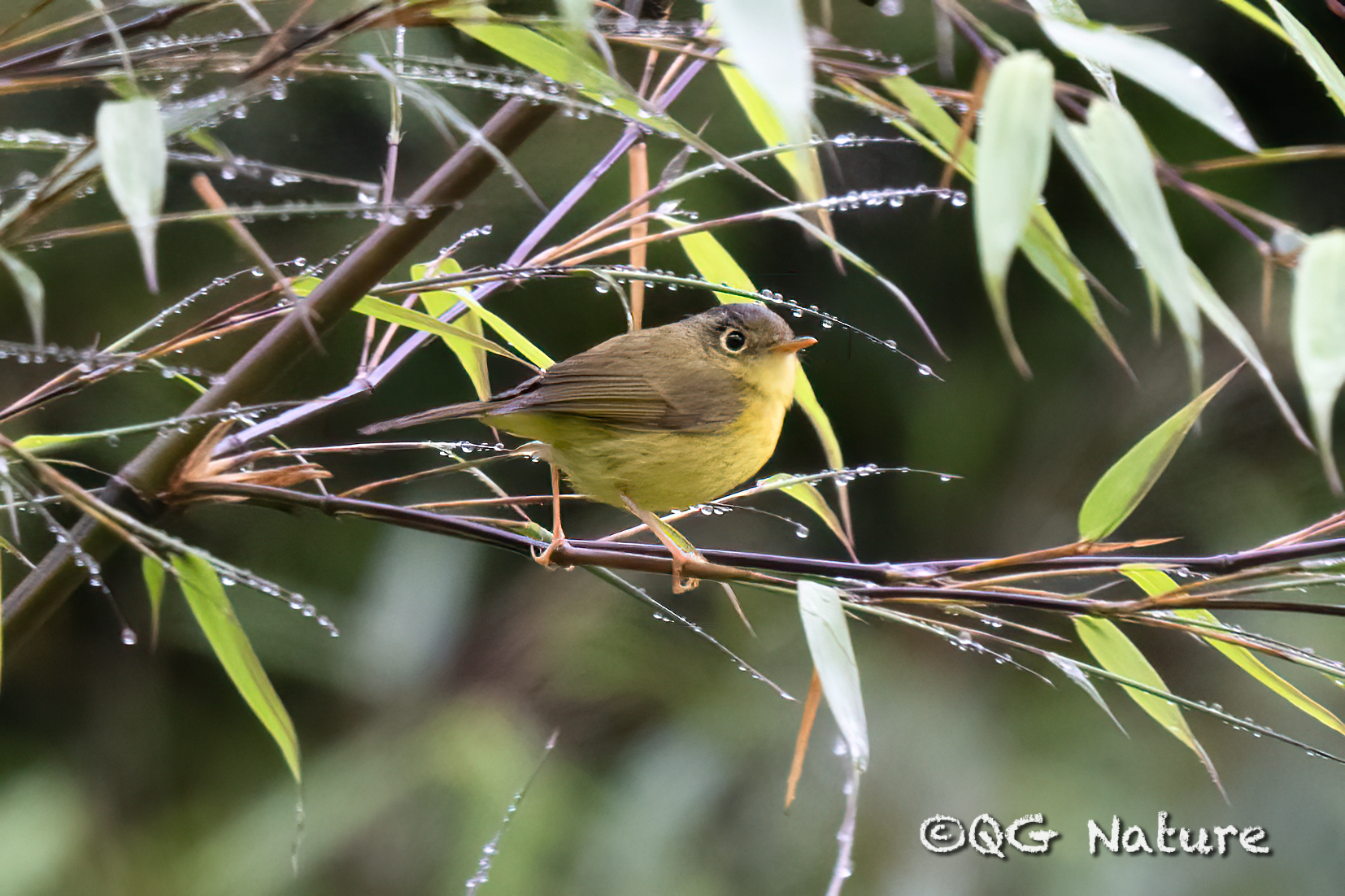

Conservation status
- Least Concern (IUCN 3.1)

Scientific classification
- Kingdom: Animalia
- Phylum: Chordata
- Class: Aves
- Order: Passeriformes
- Family: Phylloscopidae
- Genus: Phylloscopus
- Species: P. omeiensis

Binomial name
- Phylloscopus omeiensis (Martens, J, Eck, Päckert & Sun, 1999)

Synonyms
- Seicercus emeiensiss

= Martens's warbler =

Species of bird

Martens's warbler (Phylloscopus omeiensis), also known as Omei warbler or Emei Shan warbler, is a species of Old World warbler in the family Phylloscopidae (or Sylviidae). It was first described in 1999. It is found in China and Myanmar. Its natural habitats are temperate forests and subtropical or tropical moist montane forests.

Martens's warbler was initially placed in the genus Seicercus. A molecular phylogenetic study published in 2018 found that neither Phylloscopus nor Seicercus were monophyletic. In the subsequent reorganization the two genera were merged into Phylloscopus which has priority under the rules of the International Commission on Zoological Nomenclature.
