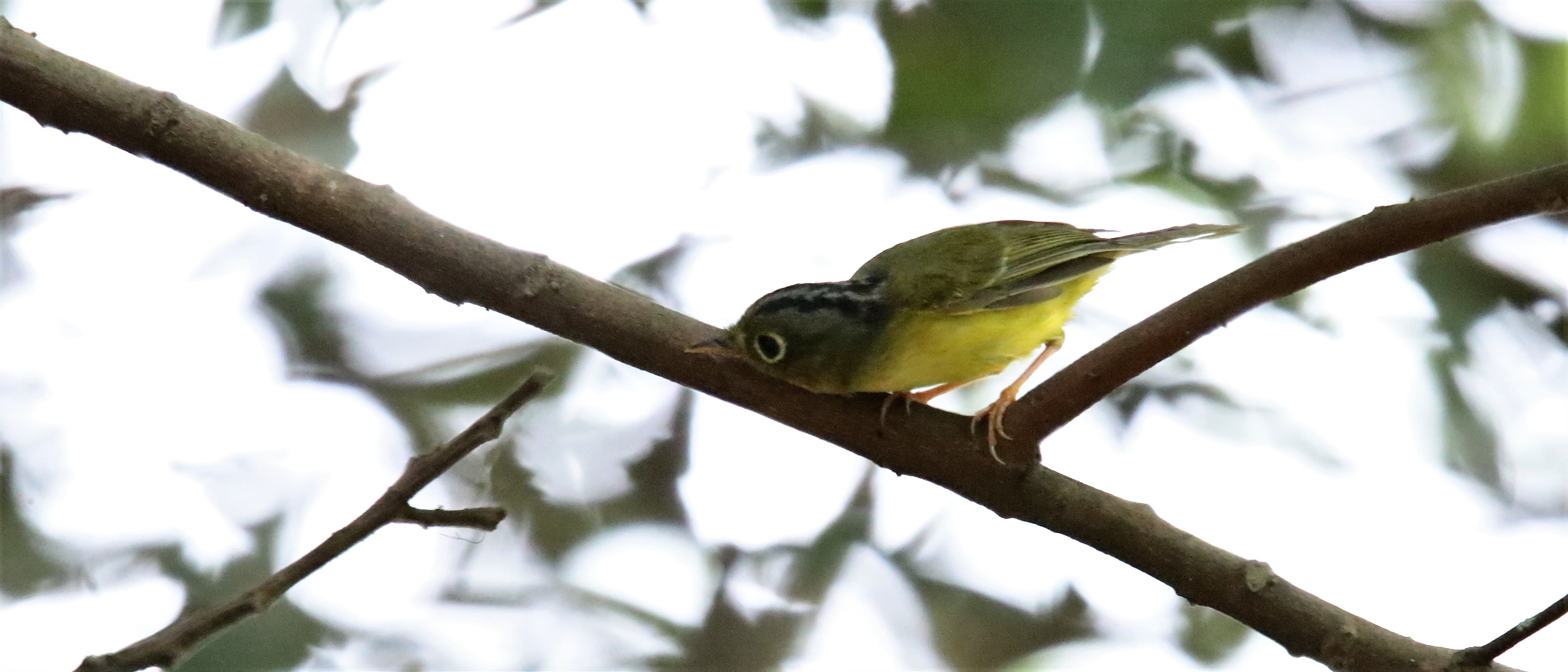

Conservation status
- Least Concern (IUCN 3.1)

Scientific classification
- Kingdom: Animalia
- Phylum: Chordata
- Class: Aves
- Order: Passeriformes
- Family: Phylloscopidae
- Genus: Phylloscopus
- Species: P. valentini

Binomial name
- Phylloscopus valentini (Hartert, 1907)

Synonyms
- Seicercus valentini

= Bianchi's warbler =

Species of bird

Bianchi's warbler (Phylloscopus valentini) is a species of leaf warbler (family Phylloscopidae). It was formerly included in the "Old World warbler" assemblage.

It is found in China, Laos, Myanmar, and Vietnam. Its natural habitats are temperate forests, subtropical or tropical moist lowland forests, and subtropical or tropical moist montane forests.

Bianchi's warbler was previously placed in the genus Seicercus. A molecular phylogenetic study published in 2018 found that neither Phylloscopus nor Seicercus were monophyletic. In the subsequent reorganization the two genera were merged into Phylloscopus which has priority under the rules of the International Commission on Zoological Nomenclature. The species name honours the Russian ornithologist Valentin Lvovich Bianchi (1857–1920).

== Diet ==
It is an insectivore.
