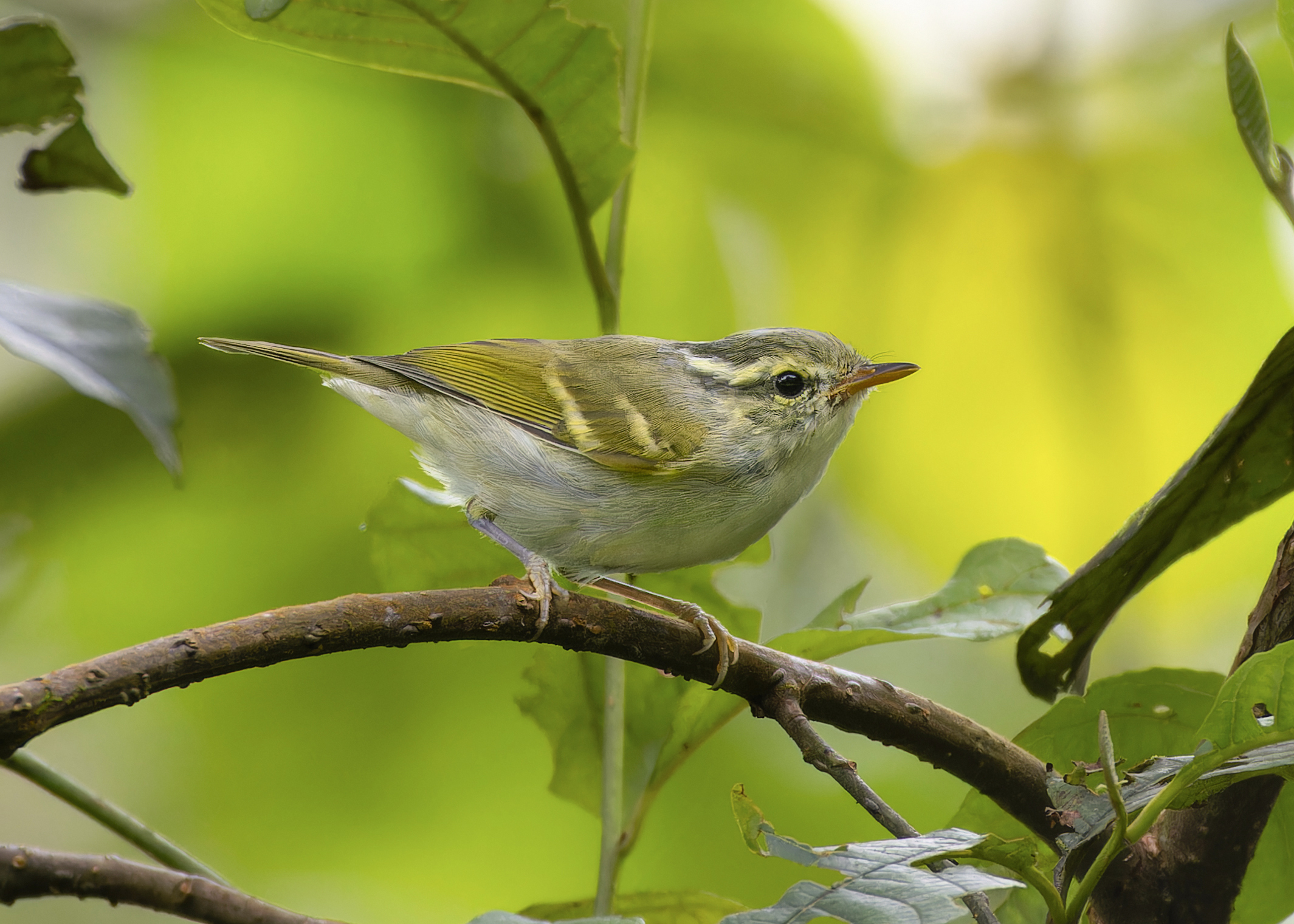
- In Lava, West Bengal, India.

Conservation status
- Least Concern (IUCN 3.1)

Scientific classification
- Kingdom: Animalia
- Phylum: Chordata
- Class: Aves
- Order: Passeriformes
- Family: Phylloscopidae
- Genus: Phylloscopus
- Species: P. reguloides

Binomial name
- Phylloscopus reguloides (Blyth, 1842)

= Blyth's leaf warbler =

Species of bird

Blyth's leaf warbler (Phylloscopus reguloides) is a species of leaf warbler (family Phylloscopidae). It was formerly included in the "Old World warbler" assemblage.

It is found mainly in Southeast Asia, southern China and along the Himalayas till northern Pakistan. Its natural habitat is subtropical or tropical moist montane forests.

This bird was named after the English zoologist Edward Blyth.

In regard to its birdsong complexity, which takes into account the number of distinct notes, Blyth leaf warbler's high complexity is a consequence of increased variation between song types.
