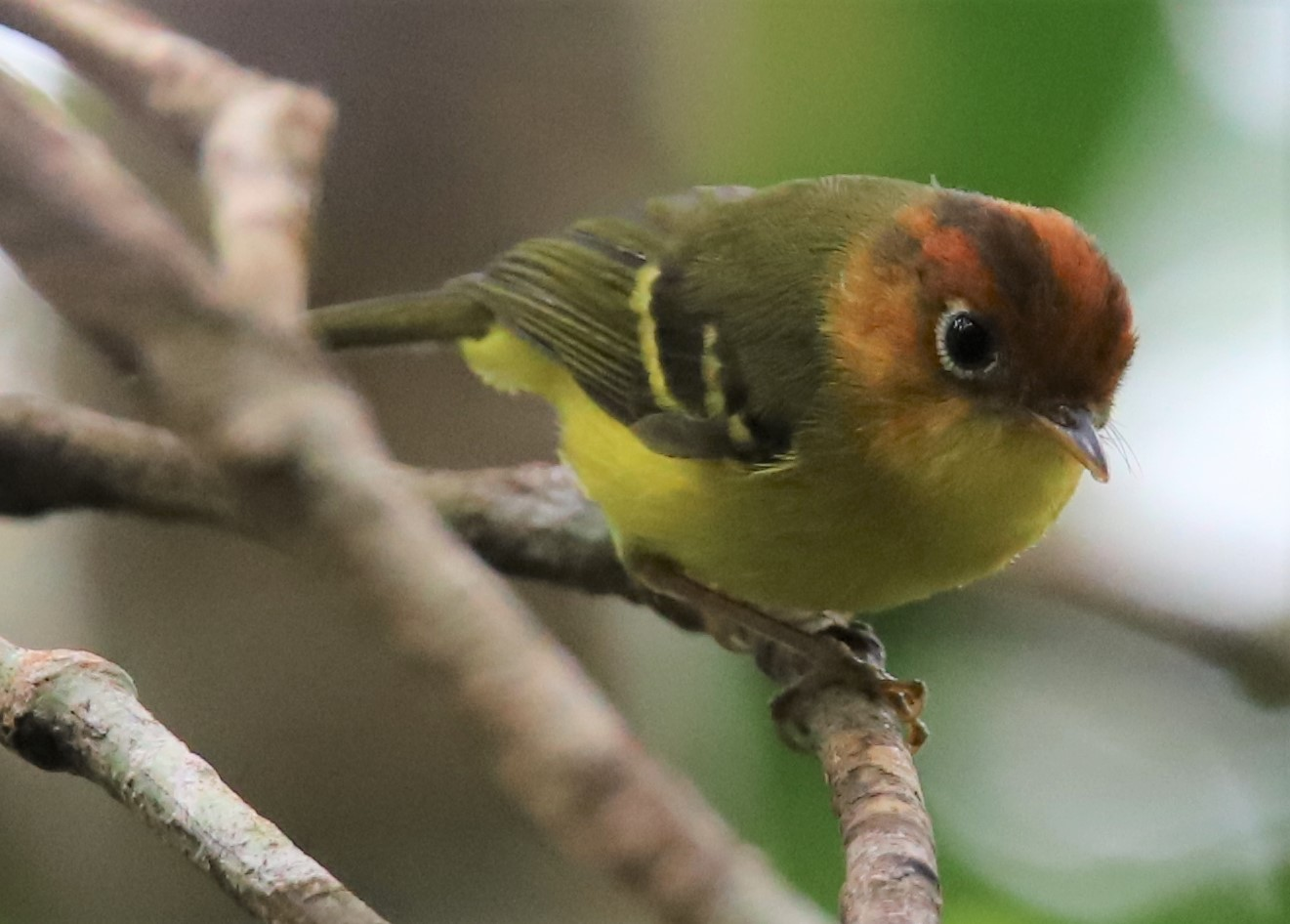

Conservation status
- Least Concern (IUCN 3.1)

Scientific classification
- Kingdom: Animalia
- Phylum: Chordata
- Class: Aves
- Order: Passeriformes
- Family: Phylloscopidae
- Genus: Phylloscopus
- Species: P. montis

Binomial name
- Phylloscopus montis (Sharpe, 1887)

Synonyms
- Seicercus montis

= Yellow-breasted warbler =

Species of bird

The yellow-breasted warbler (Phylloscopus montis) is a species of Old World warbler in the family Phylloscopidae. It is found in Indonesia, Malaysia, and Palawan Island in the Philippines. The species is most common on the islands of Sumatra and Borneo in Indonesia. Its natural habitats are subtropical or tropical moist lowland forest and subtropical or tropical moist montane forest.

The species nests in mid-February and breeds February–April. It builds domed nests with a side entrance out of grasses and bryophytes. Nests are found among roots under the overhanging lip of an eroded bank or other similar place. It forages for food alone or with small parties of not more than five birds.

The yellow-breasted warbler was previously placed in the genus Seicercus. A molecular phylogenetic study published in 2018 found that neither Phylloscopus nor Seicercus were monophyletic. In the subsequent reorganization the two genera were merged into Phylloscopus which has priority under the rules of the International Commission on Zoological Nomenclature.

The yellow-breasted warbler has a large range and a steady population size. From the perspective of conservation biology, this species is classified as one of least concern, meaning it does not appear to be threatened or vulnerable to extinction at the present time.
