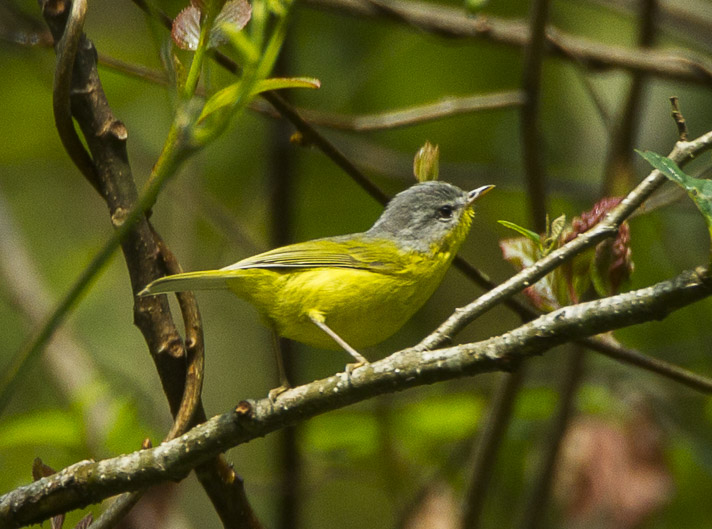
- In Bhutan

Conservation status
- Least Concern (IUCN 3.1)

Scientific classification
- Kingdom: Animalia
- Phylum: Chordata
- Class: Aves
- Order: Passeriformes
- Family: Phylloscopidae
- Genus: Phylloscopus
- Species: P. xanthoschistos

Binomial name
- Phylloscopus xanthoschistos (Gray, JE & Gray, GR, 1847)

Synonyms
- Seicercus xanthoschistos G.E.Gray & G.R.Gray, 1846

= Grey-hooded warbler =

Species of bird

The grey-hooded warbler (Phylloscopus xanthoschistos) is a species of leaf warbler (family Phylloscopidae). It is most famous for the way it warbles. It was formerly included in the "Old World warbler" assemblage.

It is found in the Himalayas. Its natural habitat is temperate forests.
