= List of birds of China =

This is a list of the bird species recorded in China. The avifauna of China include a total of 1431 species, of which 57 are endemic, and 3 have been introduced by humans. Of these, 108 species are globally threatened.

This list's taxonomic treatment (designation and sequence of orders, families and species) and nomenclature (common and scientific names) follow the conventions of The Clements Checklist of Birds of the World, 2022 edition. The family accounts at the beginning of each heading reflect this taxonomy, as do the species counts found in each family account. Introduced and accidental species are included in the total counts for China.

The following tags have been used to highlight several categories. The commonly occurring native species do not fall into any of these categories.

- (A) Accidental - a species that rarely or accidentally occurs in China
- (E) Endemic - a species native or restricted to China
- (I) Introduced - a species introduced to China as a consequence, direct or indirect, of human actions
- (Ex) Extirpated - a species no longer found in China but found elsewhere

== Ducks, geese, and waterfowl ==
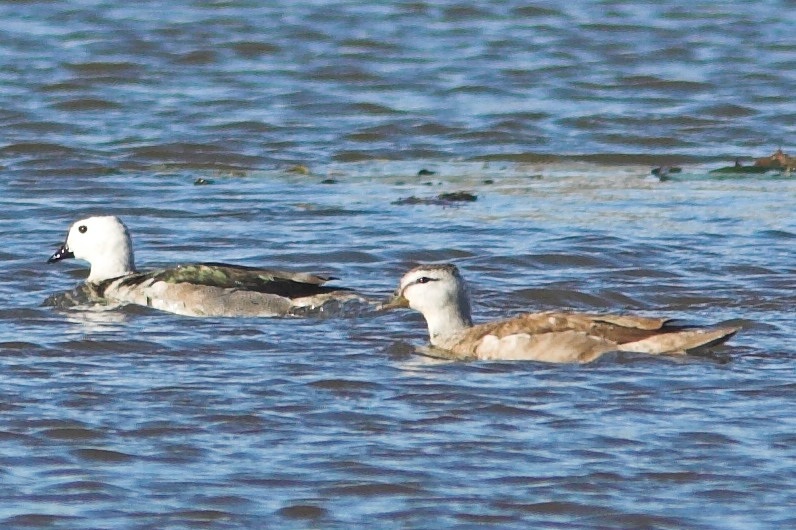
Cotton pygmy-goose

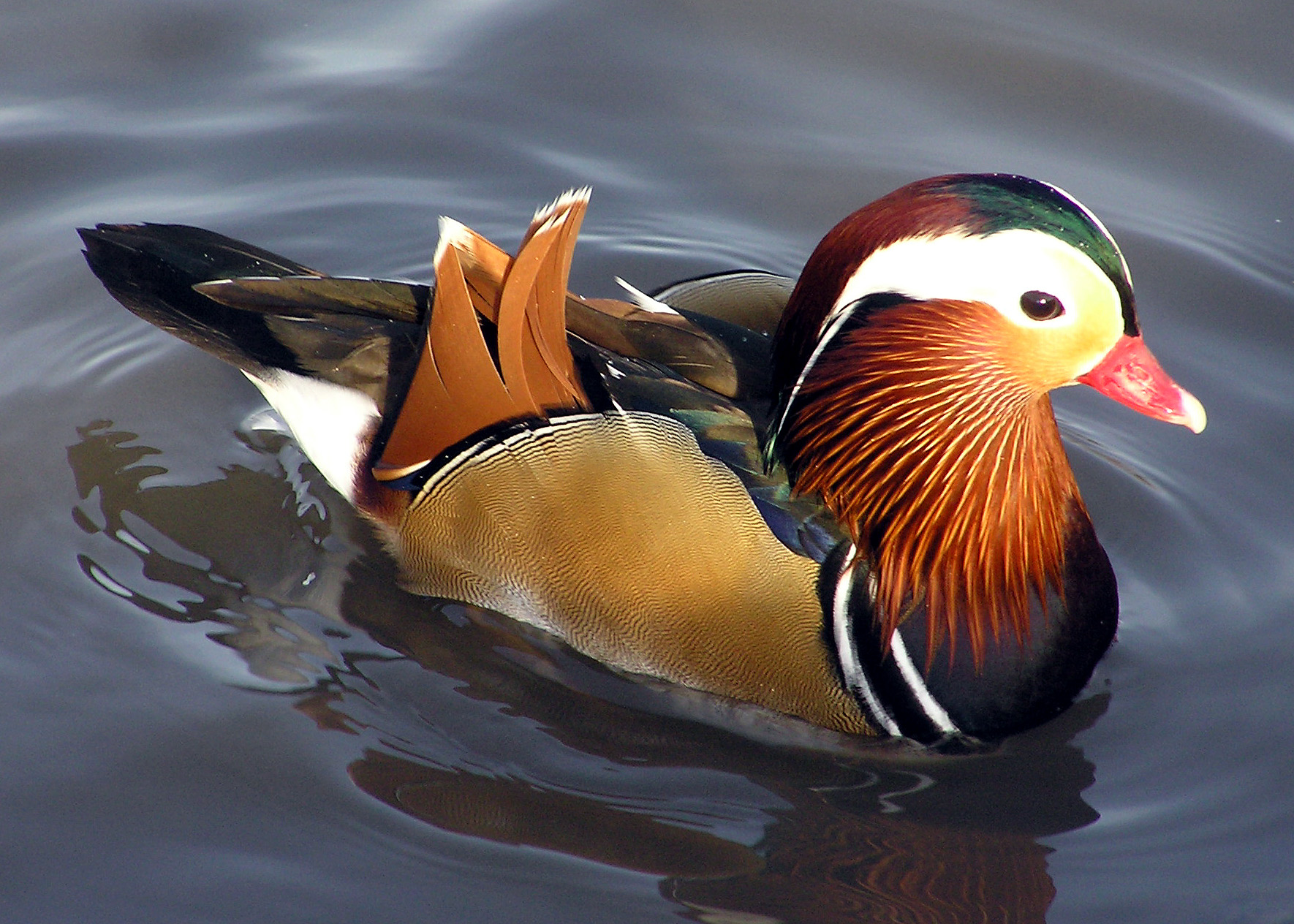
Mandarin duck

Order: Anseriformes Family: Anatidae

Anatidae includes the ducks and most duck-like waterfowl, such as geese and swans. These birds are adapted to an aquatic existence with webbed feet, flattened bills, and feathers that are excellent at shedding water due to an oily coating.

- Lesser whistling-duck, Dendrocygna javanica
- Bar-headed goose, Anser indicus
- Snow goose, Anser caerulescens (A)
- Graylag goose, Anser anser
- Swan goose, Anser cygnoides
- Greater white-fronted goose, Anser albifrons
- Lesser white-fronted goose, Anser erythropus
- Taiga bean-goose, Anser fabalis
- Tundra bean-goose, Anser serrirostris
- Brant, Branta bernicla
- Barnacle goose, Branta leucopsis (A)
- Cackling goose, Branta hutchinsii (A)
- Canada goose, Branta canadensis (A)
- Red-breasted goose, Branta ruficollis (A)
- Mute swan, Cygnus olor
- Tundra swan, Cygnus columbianus
- Whooper swan, Cygnus cygnus
- Knob-billed duck, Sarkidiornis melanotos
- Ruddy shelduck, Tadorna ferruginea
- Common shelduck, Tadorna tadorna
- Cotton pygmy-goose, Nettapus coromandelianus
- Mandarin duck, Aix galericulata
- Baikal teal, Sibirionetta formosa
- Garganey, Spatula querquedula
- Northern shoveler, Spatula clypeata
- Gadwall, Mareca strepera
- Falcated duck, Mareca falcata
- Eurasian wigeon, Mareca penelope
- American wigeon, Mareca americana (A)
- Indian spot-billed duck, Anas poecilorhyncha
- Eastern spot-billed duck, Anas zonorhyncha
- Mallard, Anas platyrhynchos
- Northern pintail, Anas acuta
- Green-winged teal, Anas crecca
- Marbled teal, Marmaronetta angustirostris (A)
- Red-crested pochard, Netta rufina
- Canvasback, Aythya valisineria (A)
- Common pochard, Aythya ferina
- Ferruginous duck, Aythya nyroca
- Baer's pochard, Aythya baeri
- Tufted duck, Aythya fuligula
- Greater scaup, Aythya marila
- Steller's eider, Polysticta stelleri (A)
- Harlequin duck, Histrionicus histrionicus
- Velvet scoter, Melanitta fusca (A)
- Stejneger's scoter, Melanitta stejnegeri
- Black scoter, Melanitta americana (A)
- Long-tailed duck, Clangula hyemalis
- Common goldeneye, Bucephala clangula
- Smew, Mergellus albellus
- Common merganser, Mergus merganser
- Red-breasted merganser, Mergus serrator
- Scaly-sided merganser, Mergus squamatus
- White-headed duck, Oxyura leucocephala

== Pheasants, grouse, and allies ==
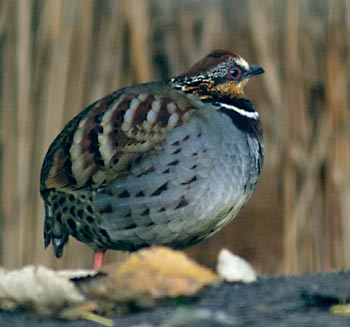
White-necklaced partridge

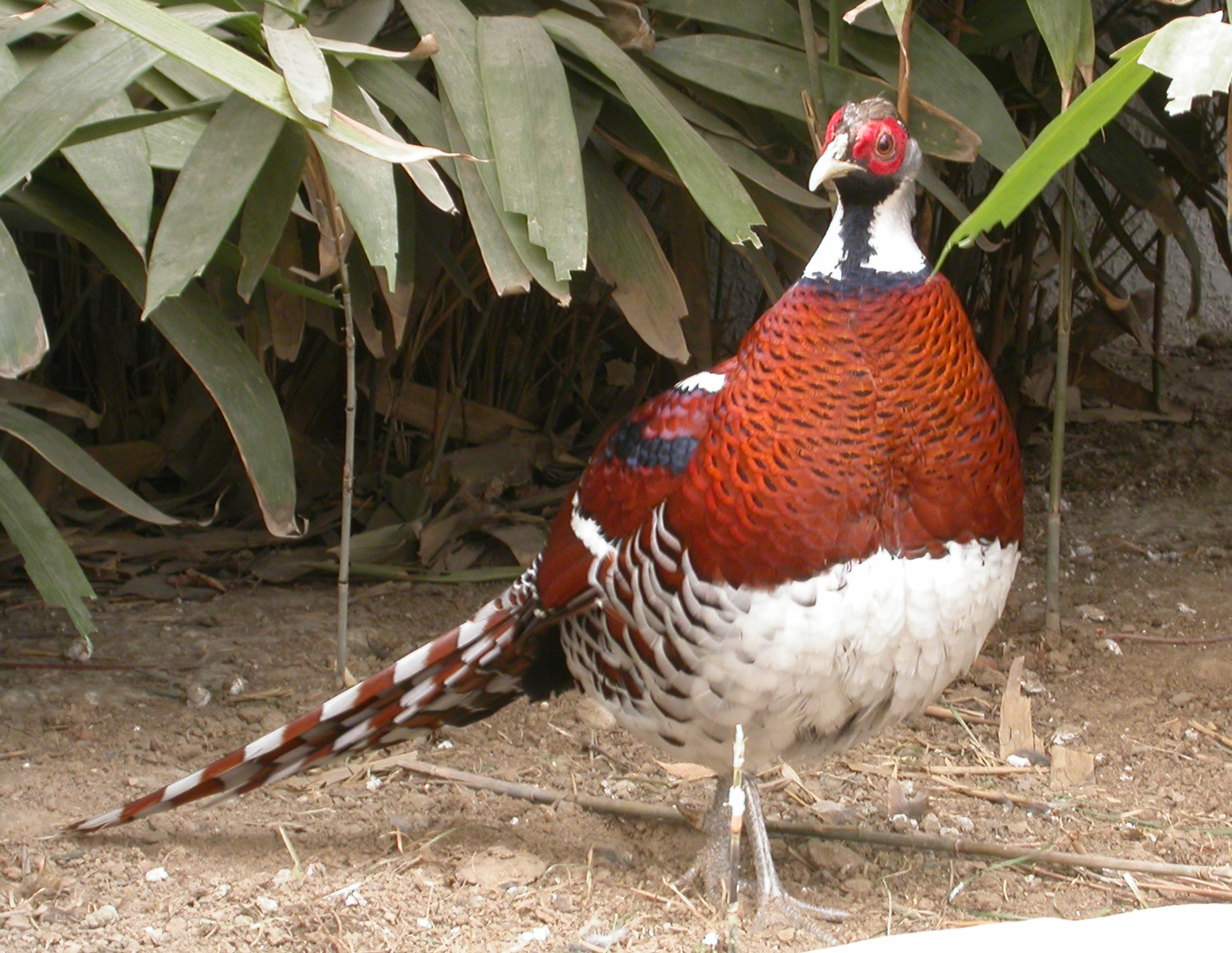
Elliot's pheasant

Order: Galliformes Family: Phasianidae

The Phasianidae are a family of terrestrial birds which consists of quails, partridges, snowcocks, francolins, spurfowls, tragopans, monals, pheasants, peafowls, grouse, ptarmigan, and jungle fowls. In general, they are plump (although they vary in size) and have broad, relatively short wings.

- Hill partridge, Arborophila torqueola
- Sichuan partridge, Arborophila rufipectus (E)
- Chestnut-breasted partridge, Arborophila mandellii
- White-necklaced partridge, Arborophila gingica (E)
- Rufous-throated partridge, Arborophila rufogularis
- Hainan partridge, Arborophila ardens (E)
- White-cheeked partridge, Arborophila atrogularis
- Bar-backed partridge, Arborophila brunneopectus
- Snow partridge, Lerwa lerwa
- Blood pheasant, Ithaginis cruentus
- Western tragopan, Tragopan melanocephalus
- Satyr tragopan, Tragopan satyra
- Blyth's tragopan, Tragopan blythii
- Temminck's tragopan, Tragopan temminckii
- Cabot's tragopan, Tragopan caboti (E)
- Verreaux's partridge, Tetraophasis obscurus (E)
- Szecheny's partridge, Tetraophasis szechenyii
- Himalayan monal, Lophophorus impejanus
- Sclater's monal, Lophophorus sclateri
- Chinese monal, Lophophorus lhuysii (E)
- Koklass pheasant, Pucrasia macrolopha
- Hazel grouse, Tetrastes bonasia
- Severtzov's grouse, Tetrastes sewerzowi (E)
- Willow ptarmigan, Lagopus lagopus
- Rock ptarmigan, Lagopus muta
- Siberian grouse, Falcipennis falcipennis
- Black-billed capercaillie, Tetrao urogalloides
- Western capercaillie, Tetrao urogallus
- Black grouse, Lyrurus tetrix
- Tibetan partridge, Perdix hodgsoniae
- Gray partridge, Perdix perdix
- Daurian partridge, Perdix dauurica
- Reeves's pheasant, Syrmaticus reevesii (E)
- Elliot's pheasant, Syrmaticus ellioti (E)
- Hume's pheasant, Syrmaticus humiae
- Golden pheasant, Chrysolophus pictus (E)
- Lady Amherst's pheasant, Chrysolophus amherstiae
- Ring-necked pheasant, Phasianus colchicus
- Tibetan eared-pheasant, Crossoptilon harmani
- White eared-pheasant, Crossoptilon crossoptilon (E)
- Brown eared-pheasant, Crossoptilon mantchuricum (E)
- Blue eared-pheasant, Crossoptilon auritum (E)
- Kalij pheasant, Lophura leucomelanos
- Silver pheasant, Lophura nycthemera
- Green peafowl, Pavo muticus
- Scaly-breasted partridge, Tropicoperdix chloropus
- Hainan peacock-pheasant, Polyplectron katsumatae (E)
- Gray peacock-pheasant, Polyplectron bicalcaratum
- Mountain bamboo-partridge, Bambusicola fytchii
- Chinese bamboo-partridge, Bambusicola thoracicus
- Red junglefowl, Gallus gallus
- Chinese francolin, Francolinus pintadeanus
- Tibetan snowcock, Tetraogallus tibetanus
- Altai snowcock, Tetraogallus altaicus
- Himalayan snowcock, Tetraogallus himalayensis
- Blue-breasted quail, Synoicus chinensis
- Common quail, Coturnix coturnix
- Japanese quail, Coturnix japonica
- Chukar, Alectoris chukar
- Przevalski's partridge, Alectoris magna (E)

== Flamingos ==
Order: Phoenicopteriformes Family: Phoenicopteridae

Flamingos are gregarious wading birds, usually 3 to 5 feet (0.9 to 1.5 m) tall, found in both the Western and Eastern Hemispheres. Flamingos filter-feed on shellfish and algae. Their oddly shaped beaks are specially adapted to separate mud and silt from the food they consume and, uniquely, are used upside-down.

- Greater flamingo, Phoenicopterus roseus (A)

== Grebes ==
Order: Podicipediformes Family: Podicipedidae

Grebes are small to medium-large freshwater diving birds. They have lobed toes and are excellent swimmers and divers. However, they have their feet placed far back on the body, making them quite ungainly on land.

- Little grebe, Tachybaptus ruficollis
- Horned grebe, Podiceps auritus
- Red-necked grebe, Podiceps grisegena
- Great crested grebe, Podiceps cristatus
- Eared grebe, Podiceps nigricollis

== Pigeons and doves ==
Order: Columbiformes Family: Columbidae

Pigeons and doves are stout-bodied birds with short necks and short slender bills with a fleshy cere.

- Rock pigeon, Columba livia
- Hill pigeon, Columba rupestris
- Snow pigeon, Columba leuconota
- Stock dove, Columba oenas
- Yellow-eyed pigeon, Columba eversmanni
- Common wood-pigeon, Columba palumbus
- Speckled wood-pigeon, Columba hodgsonii
- Ashy wood-pigeon, Columba pulchricollis
- Pale-capped pigeon, Columba punicea (Ex?)
- Japanese wood-pigeon, Columba janthina
- European turtle-dove, Streptopelia turtur
- Oriental turtle-dove, Streptopelia orientalis
- Eurasian collared-dove, Streptopelia decaocto
- Burmese collared-dove, Streptopelia xanthocycla
- Red collared-dove, Streptopelia tranquebarica
- Spotted dove, Streptopelia chinensis
- Laughing dove, Streptopelia senegalensis
- Barred cuckoo-dove, Macropygia unchall
- Little cuckoo-dove, Macropygia ruficeps
- Asian emerald dove, Chalcophaps indica
- Orange-breasted green-pigeon, Treron bicinctus
- Ashy-headed green-pigeon, Treron phayrei
- Thick-billed green-pigeon, Treron curvirostra
- Yellow-footed green-pigeon, Treron phoenicopterus
- Yellow-vented green-pigeon, Treron seimundi (A)
- Pin-tailed green-pigeon, Treron apicauda
- Wedge-tailed green-pigeon, Treron sphenurus
- White-bellied green-pigeon, Treron sieboldii
- Whistling green-pigeon, Treron formosae
- Black-chinned fruit-dove, Ptilinopus leclancheri
- Green imperial-pigeon, Ducula aenea
- Mountain imperial-pigeon, Ducula badia

== Sandgrouse ==
Order: Pterocliformes Family: Pteroclidae

Sandgrouse have small, pigeon like heads and necks, but sturdy compact bodies. They have long pointed wings and sometimes tails and a fast direct flight. Flocks fly to watering holes at dawn and dusk. Their legs are feathered down to the toes.

- Tibetan sandgrouse, Syrrhaptes tibetanus
- Pallas's sandgrouse, Syrrhaptes paradoxus
- Black-bellied sandgrouse, Pterocles orientalis

== Bustards ==
Order: Otidiformes Family: Otididae

Bustards are large terrestrial birds mainly associated with dry open country and steppes in the Old World. They are omnivorous and nest on the ground. They walk steadily on strong legs and big toes, pecking for food as they go. They have long broad wings with "fingered" wingtips and striking patterns in flight. Many have interesting mating displays.

- Great bustard, Otis tarda
- MacQueen's bustard, Chlamydotis macqueenii
- Little bustard, Tetrax tetrax

== Cuckoos ==
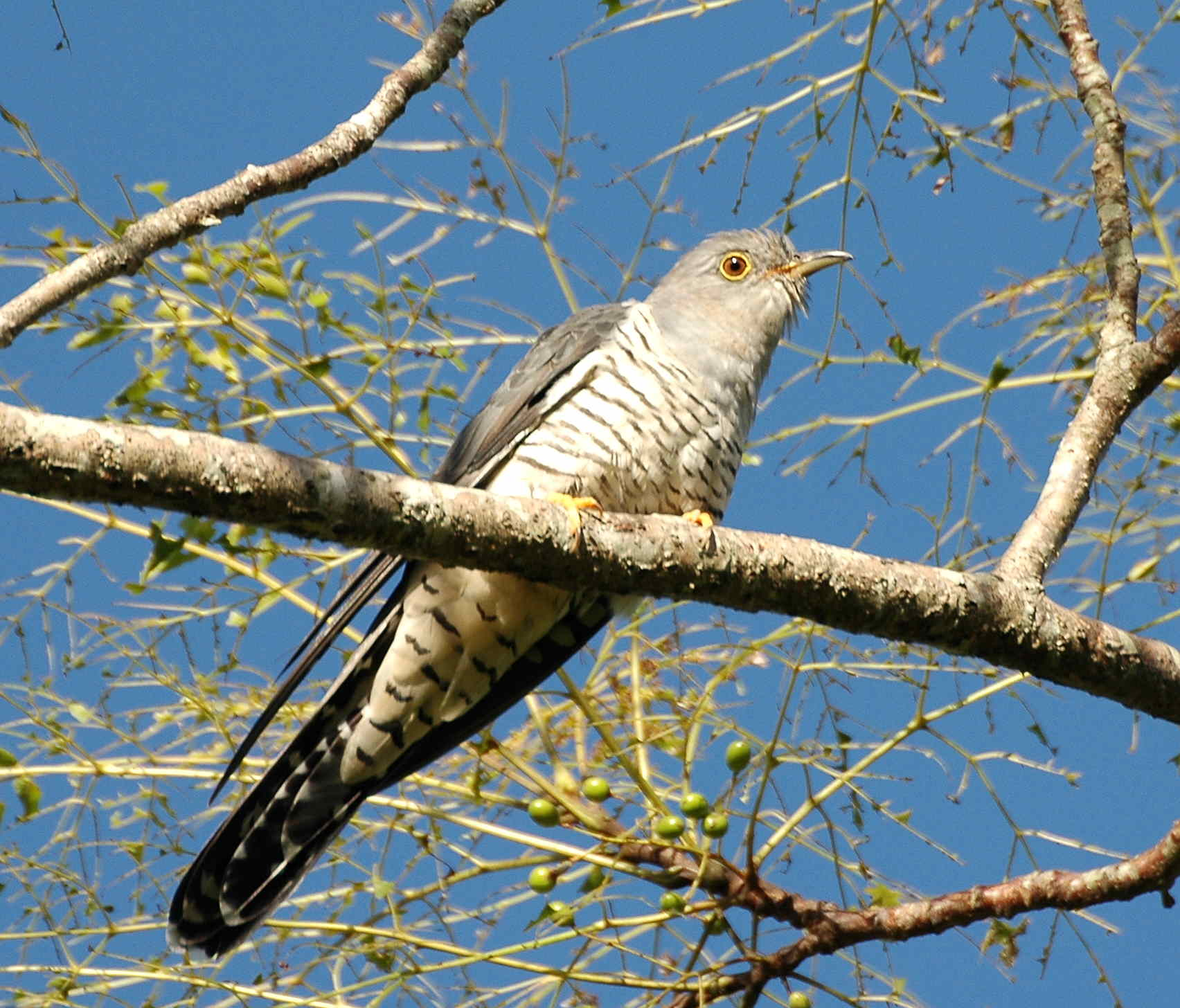
Oriental cuckoo

Order: Cuculiformes Family: Cuculidae

The family Cuculidae includes cuckoos, roadrunners and anis. These birds are of variable size with slender bodies, long tails and strong legs.

- Greater coucal, Centropus sinensis
- Lesser coucal, Centropus bengalensis
- Green-billed malkoha, Phaenicophaeus tristis
- Chestnut-winged cuckoo, Clamator coromandus
- Pied cuckoo, Clamator jacobinus
- Asian koel, Eudynamys scolopaceus
- Asian emerald cuckoo, Chrysococcyx maculatus
- Violet cuckoo, Chrysococcyx xanthorhynchus
- Banded bay cuckoo, Cacomantis sonneratii
- Plaintive cuckoo, Cacomantis merulinus
- Fork-tailed drongo-cuckoo, Surniculus dicruroides
- Square-tailed drongo-cuckoo, Surniculus lugubris
- Large hawk-cuckoo, Hierococcyx sparverioides
- Northern hawk-cuckoo, Hierococcyx hyperythrus
- Hodgson's hawk-cuckoo, Hierococcyx nisicolor
- Lesser cuckoo, Cuculus poliocephalus
- Indian cuckoo, Cuculus micropterus
- Himalayan cuckoo, Cuculus saturatus
- Common cuckoo, Cuculus canorus
- Oriental cuckoo, Cuculus optatus

== Frogmouths ==
Order: Caprimulgiformes Family: Podargidae

The frogmouths are a group of nocturnal birds related to the nightjars. They are named for their large flattened hooked bill and huge frog-like gape, which they use to take insects.

- Hodgson's frogmouth, Batrachostomus hodgsoni

== Nightjars and allies ==
Order: Caprimulgiformes Family: Caprimulgidae

Nightjars are medium-sized nocturnal birds that usually nest on the ground. They have long wings, short legs and very short bills. Most have small feet, of little use for walking, and long pointed wings. Their soft plumage is camouflaged to resemble bark or leaves.

- Great eared-nightjar, Lyncornis macrotis
- Gray nightjar, Caprimulgus jotaka
- Eurasian nightjar, Caprimulgus europaeus
- Egyptian nightjar, Caprimulgus aegyptius
- Large-tailed nightjar, Caprimulgus macrurus
- Savanna nightjar, Caprimulgus affinis

== Swifts ==
Order: Caprimulgiformes Family: Apodidae

Swifts are small birds which spend the majority of their lives flying. These birds have very short legs and never settle voluntarily on the ground, perching instead only on vertical surfaces. Many swifts have long swept-back wings which resemble a crescent or boomerang.

- White-throated needletail, Hirundapus caudacutus
- Silver-backed needletail, Hirundapus cochinchinensis
- Brown-backed needletail, Hirundapus giganteus (A)
- Himalayan swiftlet, Aerodramus brevirostris
- Black-nest swiftlet, Aerodramus maximus
- White-nest swiftlet, Aerodramus fuciphagus
- Germain's swiftlet, Aerodramus germani
- Alpine swift, Tachymarptis melba (A)
- Common swift, Apus apus
- Pacific swift, Apus pacificus
- Salim Ali's swift, Apus salimalii (E)
- Blyth's swift, Apus leuconyx
- Cook's swift, Apus cooki
- Dark-rumped swift, Apus acuticauda (A)
- House swift, Apus nipalensis
- Asian palm-swift, Cypsiurus balasiensis

== Treeswifts ==
Order: Caprimulgiformes Family: Hemiprocnidae

The treeswifts, also called crested swifts, are closely related to the true swifts. They differ from the other swifts in that they have crests, long forked tails and softer plumage.

- Crested treeswift, Hemiprocne coronata

== Rails, gallinules, and coots ==
Order: Gruiformes Family: Rallidae

Rallidae is a large family of small to medium-sized birds which includes the rails, crakes, coots and gallinules. Typically they inhabit dense vegetation in damp environments near lakes, swamps or rivers. In general they are shy and secretive birds, making them difficult to observe. Most species have strong legs and long toes which are well adapted to soft uneven surfaces. They tend to have short, rounded wings and to be weak fliers.

- Water rail, Rallus aquaticus
- Brown-cheeked rail, Rallus indicus
- Corn crake, Crex crex
- Slaty-breasted rail, Lewinia striata
- Spotted crake, Porzana porzana
- Eurasian moorhen, Gallinula chloropus
- Eurasian coot, Fulica atra
- Grey-headed swamphen, Porphyrio poliocephalus
- White-browed crake, Poliolimnas cinereus (A)
- Watercock, Gallicrex cinerea
- White-breasted waterhen, Amaurornis phoenicurus
- Red-legged crake, Rallina fasciata (A)
- Slaty-legged crake, Rallina eurizonoides
- Ruddy-breasted crake, Zapornia fusca
- Band-bellied crake, Zapornia paykullii
- Brown crake, Zapornia akool
- Little crake, Zapornia parva
- Baillon's crake, Zapornia pusilla
- Black-tailed crake, Zapornia bicolor
- Swinhoe's rail, Coturnicops exquisitus

== Cranes ==
Order: Gruiformes Family: Gruidae

Cranes are large, long-legged and long-necked birds. Unlike the similar-looking but unrelated herons, cranes fly with necks outstretched, not pulled back. Most have elaborate and noisy courting displays or "dances". China has the greatest diversity of cranes of any country.

- Demoiselle crane, Anthropoides virgo
- Siberian crane, Leucogeranus leucogeranus
- Sandhill crane, Antigone canadensis (A)
- Sarus crane, Antigone antigone
- White-naped crane, Antigone vipio
- Common crane, Grus grus
- Hooded crane, Grus monacha
- Black-necked crane, Grus nigricollis
- Red-crowned crane, Grus japonensis

== Thick-knees ==
Order: Charadriiformes Family: Burhinidae

The thick-knees are a group of largely tropical waders in the family Burhinidae. They are found worldwide within the tropical zone, with some species also breeding in temperate Europe and Australia. They are medium to large waders with strong black or yellow-black bills, large yellow eyes and cryptic plumage. Despite being classed as waders, most species have a preference for arid or semi-arid habitats.

- Eurasian thick-knee, Burhinus oedicnemus
- Great thick-knee, Esacus recurvirostris
- Beach thick-knee, Esacus magnirostris (A)

== Avocets and stilts ==
Order: Charadriiformes Family: Recurvirostridae

Recurvirostridae is a family of large wading birds, which includes the avocets and stilts. The avocets have long legs and long up-curved bills. The stilts have extremely long legs and long, thin, straight bills.

- Black-winged stilt, Himantopus himantopus
- Pied avocet, Recurvirostra avosetta

== Ibisbill ==
Order: Charadriiformes Family: Ibidorhynchidae

The ibisbill is related to the waders, but is sufficiently distinctive to be a family unto itself. The adult is gray with a white belly, red legs, a long down curved bill, and a black face and breast band.

- Ibisbill, Ibidorhyncha struthersii

== Oystercatchers ==
Order: Charadriiformes Family: Haematopodidae

The oystercatchers are large and noisy plover-like birds, with strong bills used for smashing or prising open molluscs.

- Eurasian oystercatcher, Haematopus ostralegus

== Plovers and lapwings ==
Order: Charadriiformes Family: Charadriidae

The family Charadriidae includes the plovers, dotterels and lapwings. They are small to medium-sized birds with compact bodies, short, thick necks and long, usually pointed, wings. They are found in open country worldwide, mostly in habitats near water.

- Black-bellied plover, Pluvialis squatarola
- European golden-plover, Pluvialis apricaria (A)
- Pacific golden-plover, Pluvialis fulva
- Northern lapwing, Vanellus vanellus
- River lapwing, Vanellus duvaucelii
- Gray-headed lapwing, Vanellus cinereus
- Red-wattled lapwing, Vanellus indicus
- Sociable lapwing, Vanellus gregarius (A) (Ex?)
- White-tailed lapwing, Vanellus leucurus (A)
- Lesser sand-plover, Charadrius mongolus
- Greater sand-plover, Charadrius leschenaultii
- Caspian plover, Charadrius asiaticus
- Kentish plover, Charadrius alexandrinus
- White-faced plover, Charadrius dealbatus
- Common ringed plover, Charadrius hiaticula
- Semipalmated plover, Charadrius semipalmatus
- Long-billed plover, Charadrius placidus
- Little ringed plover, Charadrius dubius
- Oriental plover, Charadrius veredus
- Eurasian dotterel, Charadrius morinellus

== Painted-snipes ==
Order: Charadriiformes Family: Rostratulidae

Painted-snipes are short-legged, long-billed birds similar in shape to the true snipes, but more brightly colored.

- Greater painted-snipe, Rostratula benghalensis

== Jacanas ==
Order: Charadriiformes Family: Jacanidae

The jacanas are a group of tropical waders in the family Jacanidae. They are found throughout the tropics. They are identifiable by their huge feet and claws which enable them to walk on floating vegetation in the shallow lakes that are their preferred habitat.

- Pheasant-tailed jacana, Hydrophasianus chirurgus
- Bronze-winged jacana, Metopidius indicus (A)

== Sandpipers and allies ==
Order: Charadriiformes Family: Scolopacidae

Scolopacidae is a large diverse family of small to medium-sized shorebirds including the sandpipers, curlews, godwits, shanks, tattlers, woodcocks, snipes, dowitchers and phalaropes. The majority of these species eat small invertebrates picked out of the mud or soil. Variation in length of legs and bills enables multiple species to feed in the same habitat, particularly on the coast, without direct competition for food.

- Whimbrel, Numenius phaeopus
- Little curlew, Numenius minutus
- Far Eastern curlew, Numenius madagascariensis
- Eurasian curlew, Numenius arquata
- Bar-tailed godwit, Limosa lapponica
- Black-tailed godwit, Limosa limosa
- Ruddy turnstone, Arenaria interpres
- Great knot, Calidris tenuirostris
- Red knot, Calidris canutus
- Ruff, Calidris pugnax
- Broad-billed sandpiper, Calidris falcinellus
- Sharp-tailed sandpiper, Calidris acuminata
- Curlew sandpiper, Calidris ferruginea
- Temminck's stint, Calidris temminckii
- Long-toed stint, Calidris subminuta
- Spoon-billed sandpiper, Calidris pygmaea
- Red-necked stint, Calidris ruficollis
- Sanderling, Calidris alba
- Dunlin, Calidris alpina
- Rock sandpiper, Calidris ptilocnemis (A)
- Baird's sandpiper, Calidris bairdii (A)
- Little stint, Calidris minuta
- White-rumped sandpiper, Calidris fuscicollis (A)
- Pectoral sandpiper, Calidris melanotos (A)
- Western sandpiper, Calidris mauri (A)
- Asian dowitcher, Limnodromus semipalmatus
- Long-billed dowitcher, Limnodromus scolopaceus (A)
- Jack snipe, Lymnocryptes minimus
- Eurasian woodcock, Scolopax rusticola
- Solitary snipe, Gallinago solitaria
- Latham's snipe, Gallinago hardwickii (A)
- Wood snipe, Gallinago nemoricola
- Common snipe, Gallinago gallinago
- Pin-tailed snipe, Gallinago stenura
- Swinhoe's snipe, Gallinago megala
- Terek sandpiper, Xenus cinereus
- Red-necked phalarope, Phalaropus lobatus
- Red phalarope, Phalaropus fulicarius (A)
- Common sandpiper, Actitis hypoleucos
- Green sandpiper, Tringa ochropus
- Gray-tailed tattler, Tringa brevipes
- Spotted redshank, Tringa erythropus
- Common greenshank, Tringa nebularia
- Nordmann's greenshank, Tringa guttifer
- Marsh sandpiper, Tringa stagnatilis
- Wood sandpiper, Tringa glareola
- Common redshank, Tringa totanus

== Buttonquail ==
Order: Charadriiformes Family: Turnicidae

The buttonquail are small, drab, running birds which resemble the true quails. The female is the brighter of the sexes and initiates courtship. The male incubates the eggs and tends the young.

- Small buttonquail, Turnix sylvaticus
- Yellow-legged buttonquail, Turnix tanki
- Barred buttonquail, Turnix suscitator

== Pratincoles and coursers ==
Order: Charadriiformes Family: Glareolidae

Glareolidae is a family of wading birds comprising the pratincoles, which have short legs, long pointed wings and long forked tails, and the coursers, which have long legs, short wings and long, pointed bills which curve downwards.

- Collared pratincole, Glareola pratincola
- Oriental pratincole, Glareola maldivarum
- Black-winged pratincole, Glareola nordmanni (A)
- Small pratincole, Glareola lactea

== Skuas and jaegers ==
Order: Charadriiformes Family: Stercorariidae

The family Stercorariidae are, in general, medium to large birds, typically with gray or brown plumage, often with white markings on the wings. They nest on the ground in temperate and arctic regions and are long-distance migrants.

- South polar skua, Stercorarius maccormicki (A)
- Pomarine jaeger, Stercorarius pomarinus (A)
- Parasitic jaeger, Stercorarius parasiticus
- Long-tailed jaeger, Stercorarius longicaudus (A)

== Auks, murres, and puffins ==
Order: Charadriiformes Family: Alcidae

Alcids are superficially similar to penguins due to their black-and-white colors, their upright posture and some of their habits, however they are not related to the penguins and differ in being able to fly. Auks live on the open sea, only deliberately coming ashore to nest.

- Long-billed murrelet, Brachyramphus perdix
- Ancient murrelet, Synthliboramphus antiquus
- Japanese murrelet, Synthliboramphus wumizusume
- Rhinoceros auklet, Cerorhinca monocerata

== Gulls, terns, and skimmers ==
Order: Charadriiformes Family: Laridae

Laridae is a family of medium to large seabirds, the gulls, terns and skimmers. Gulls are typically gray or white, often with black markings on the head or wings. They have stout, longish bills and webbed feet. Terns are a group of generally medium to large seabirds typically with gray or white plumage, often with black markings on the head. Most terns hunt fish by diving but some pick insects off the surface of fresh water. Terns are generally long-lived birds, with several species known to live in excess of 30 years. Skimmers are a small family of tropical tern-like birds. They have an elongated lower mandible which they use to feed by flying low over the water surface and skimming the water for small fish.

- Black-legged kittiwake, Rissa tridactyla
- Saunders's gull, Saundersilarus saundersi
- Slender-billed gull, Chroicocephalus genei
- Silver gull, Chroicocephalus novaehollandiae (A)
- Black-headed gull, Chroicocephalus ridibundus
- Brown-headed gull, Chroicocephalus brunnicephalus
- Little gull, Hydrocoloeus minutus
- Ross's gull, Rhodostethia rosea (A)
- Franklin's gull, Leucophaeus pipixcan (A)
- Relict gull, Ichthyaetus relictus
- Pallas's gull, Ichthyaetus ichthyaetus
- Black-tailed gull, Larus crassirostris
- Common gull, Larus canus
- Herring gull, Larus argentatus
- Caspian gull, Larus cachinnans
- Lesser black-backed gull, Larus fuscus
- Slaty-backed gull, Larus schistisagus
- Glaucous-winged gull, Larus glaucescens (A)
- Glaucous gull, Larus hyperboreus
- Brown noddy, Anous stolidus
- White tern, Gygis alba
- Sooty tern, Onychoprion fuscatus
- Bridled tern, Onychoprion anaethetus
- Aleutian tern, Onychoprion aleuticus (A)
- Little tern, Sternula albifrons
- Gull-billed tern, Gelochelidon nilotica
- Caspian tern, Hydroprogne caspia
- Black tern, Chlidonias niger
- White-winged tern, Chlidonias leucopterus
- Whiskered tern, Chlidonias hybrida
- Roseate tern, Sterna dougallii
- Black-naped tern, Sterna sumatrana
- Common tern, Sterna hirundo
- Black-bellied tern, Sterna acuticauda
- River tern, Sterna aurantia
- Great crested tern, Thalasseus bergii
- Sandwich tern, Thalasseus sandvicensis (A)
- Lesser crested tern, Thalasseus bengalensis (A)
- Chinese crested tern, Thalasseus bernsteini

== Tropicbirds ==
Order: Phaethontiformes Family: Phaethontidae

Tropicbirds are slender white birds of tropical oceans, with exceptionally long central tail feathers. Their heads and long wings have black markings.

- White-tailed tropicbird, Phaethon lepturus
- Red-billed tropicbird, Phaethon aethereus
- Red-tailed tropicbird, Phaethon rubricauda

== Loons ==
Order: Gaviiformes Family: Gaviidae

Loons, known as divers in Europe, are a group of aquatic birds found in many parts of North America and northern Europe. They are the size of a large duck or small goose, which they somewhat resemble when swimming, but to which they are completely unrelated.

- Red-throated loon, Gavia stellata
- Arctic loon, Gavia arctica
- Pacific loon, Gavia pacifica
- Yellow-billed loon, Gavia adamsii (A)

== Albatrosses ==
Order: Procellariiformes Family: Diomedeidae

The albatrosses are among the largest of flying birds, and the great albatrosses from the genus Diomedea have the largest wingspans of any extant birds.

- Black-footed albatross, Phoebastria nigripes
- Short-tailed albatross, Phoebastria albatrus (A)

== Southern storm-petrels ==
Order: Procellariiformes Family: Oceanitidae

The southern storm-petrels are relatives of the petrels and are the smallest seabirds. They feed on planktonic crustaceans and small fish picked from the surface, typically while hovering.

- Wilson's storm-petrel, Oceanites oceanicus (A)

== Northern storm-petrels ==
Order: Procellariiformes Family: Hydrobatidae

The northern storm-petrels are relatives of the petrels and are the smallest seabirds. They feed on planktonic crustaceans and small fish picked from the surface, typically while hovering. The flight is fluttering and sometimes bat-like.

- Leach's storm-petrel, Hydrobates leucorhous (A)
- Swinhoe's storm-petrel, Hydrobates monorhis

== Shearwaters and petrels ==
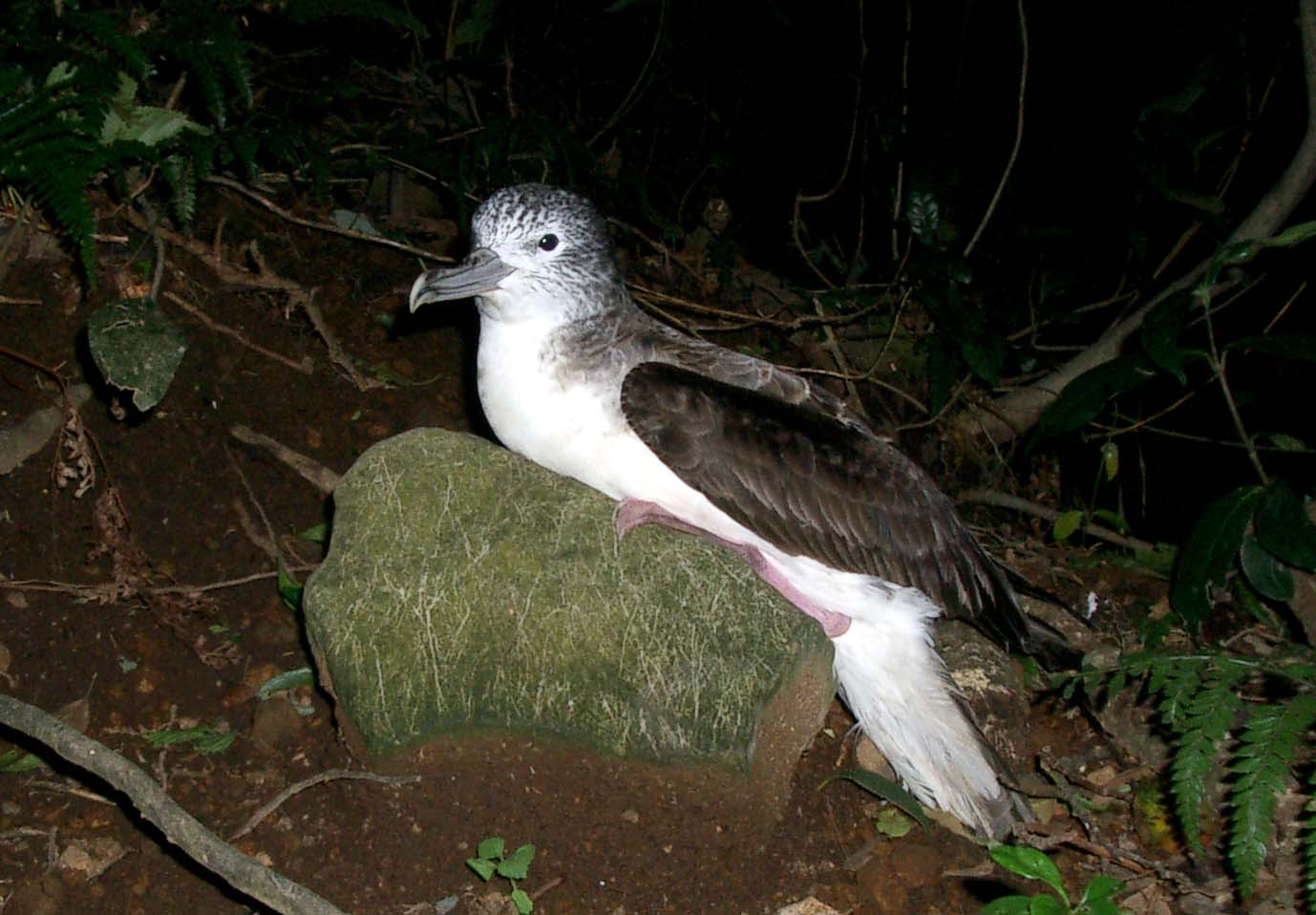
Streaked shearwater

Order: Procellariiformes Family: Procellariidae

The procellariids are the main group of medium-sized "true petrels", characterized by united nostrils with medium septum and a long outer functional primary.

- Northern fulmar, Fulmarus glacialis (A)
- Bonin petrel, Pterodroma hypoleuca
- Bulwer's petrel, Bulweria bulwerii
- Tahiti petrel, Pseudobulweria rostrata
- Streaked shearwater, Calonectris leucomelas
- Flesh-footed shearwater, Ardenna carneipes (A)
- Wedge-tailed shearwater, Ardenna pacifica
- Sooty shearwater, Ardenna grisea
- Short-tailed shearwater, Ardenna tenuirostris (A)

== Storks ==
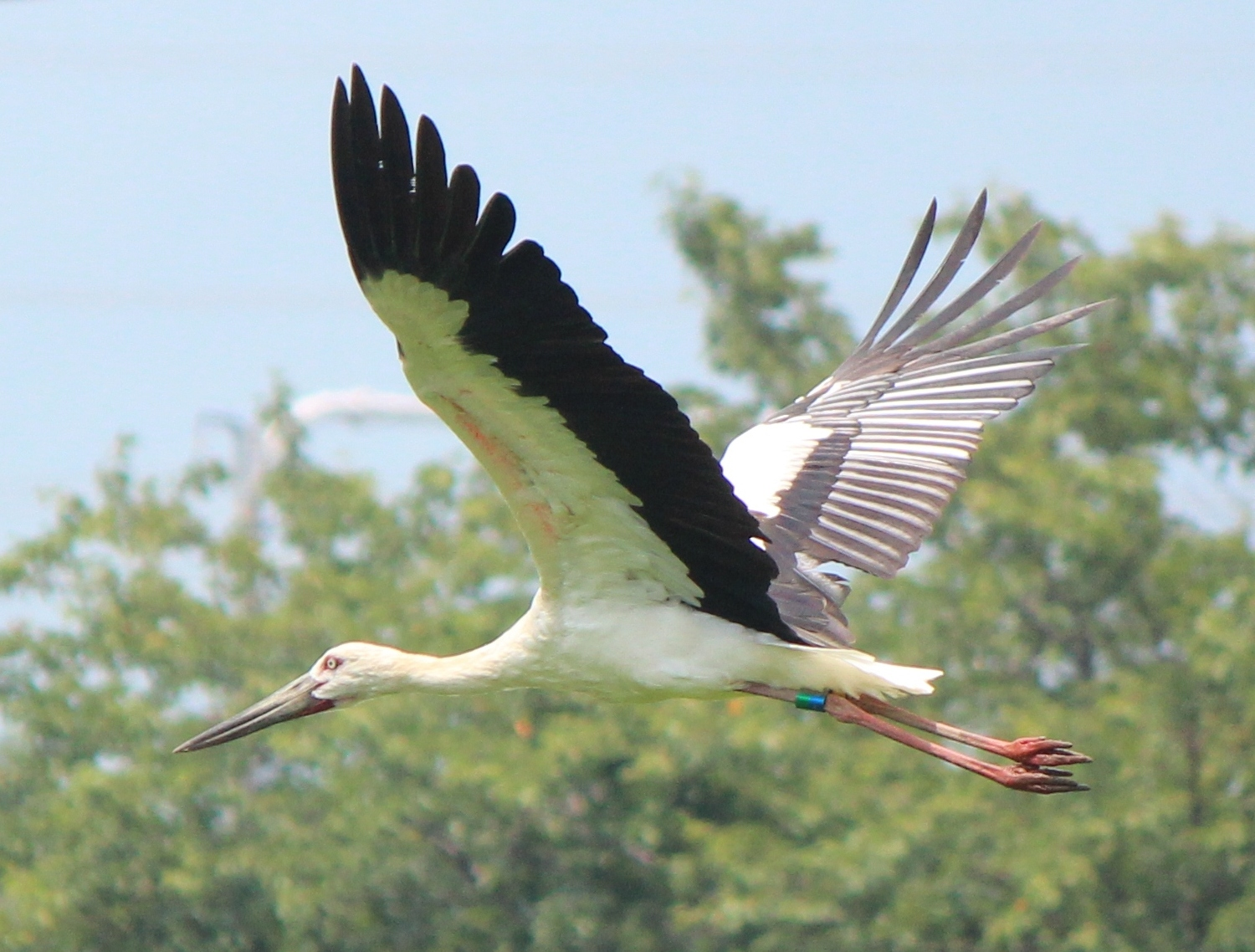
Oriental stork

Order: Ciconiiformes Family: Ciconiidae

Storks are large, long-legged, long-necked, wading birds with long, stout bills. Storks are mute, but bill-clattering is an important mode of communication at the nest. Their nests can be large and may be reused for many years. Many species are migratory.

- Asian openbill, Anastomus oscitans
- Black stork, Ciconia nigra
- Asian woolly-necked stork, Ciconia episcopus
- White stork, Ciconia ciconia (A)
- Oriental stork, Ciconia boyciana
- Lesser adjutant, Leptoptilos javanicus
- Painted stork, Mycteria leucocephala

== Frigatebirds ==
Order: Suliformes Family: Fregatidae

Frigatebirds are large seabirds usually found over tropical oceans. They are large, black-and-white or completely black, with long wings and deeply forked tails. The males have colored inflatable throat pouches. They do not swim or walk and cannot take off from a flat surface. Having the largest wingspan-to-body-weight ratio of any bird, they are essentially aerial, able to stay aloft for more than a week.

- Lesser frigatebird, Fregata ariel (A)
- Christmas Island frigatebird, Fregata andrewsi (A)
- Great frigatebird, Fregata minor

== Boobies and gannets ==
Order: Suliformes Family: Sulidae

The sulids comprise the gannets and boobies. Both groups are medium to large coastal seabirds that plunge-dive for fish.

- Masked booby, Sula dactylatra
- Brown booby, Sula leucogaster
- Red-footed booby, Sula sula

== Cormorants and shags ==
Order: Suliformes Family: Phalacrocoracidae

Phalacrocoracidae is a family of medium to large coastal, fish-eating seabirds that includes cormorants and shags. Plumage coloration varies, with the majority having mainly dark plumage, some species being black-and-white and a few being colorful.

- Little cormorant, Microcarbo niger
- Pygmy cormorant, Microcarbo pygmaeus (A)
- Red-faced cormorant, Urile urile (A)
- Pelagic cormorant, Urile pelagicus
- Great cormorant, Phalacrocorax carbo
- Japanese cormorant, Phalacrocorax capillatus

== Pelicans ==
Order: Pelecaniformes Family: Pelecanidae

Pelicans are large water birds with a distinctive pouch under their beak. As with other members of the order Pelecaniformes, they have webbed feet with four toes.

- Great white pelican, Pelecanus onocrotalus
- Spot-billed pelican, Pelecanus philippensis
- Dalmatian pelican, Pelecanus crispus

== Herons, egrets, and bitterns ==
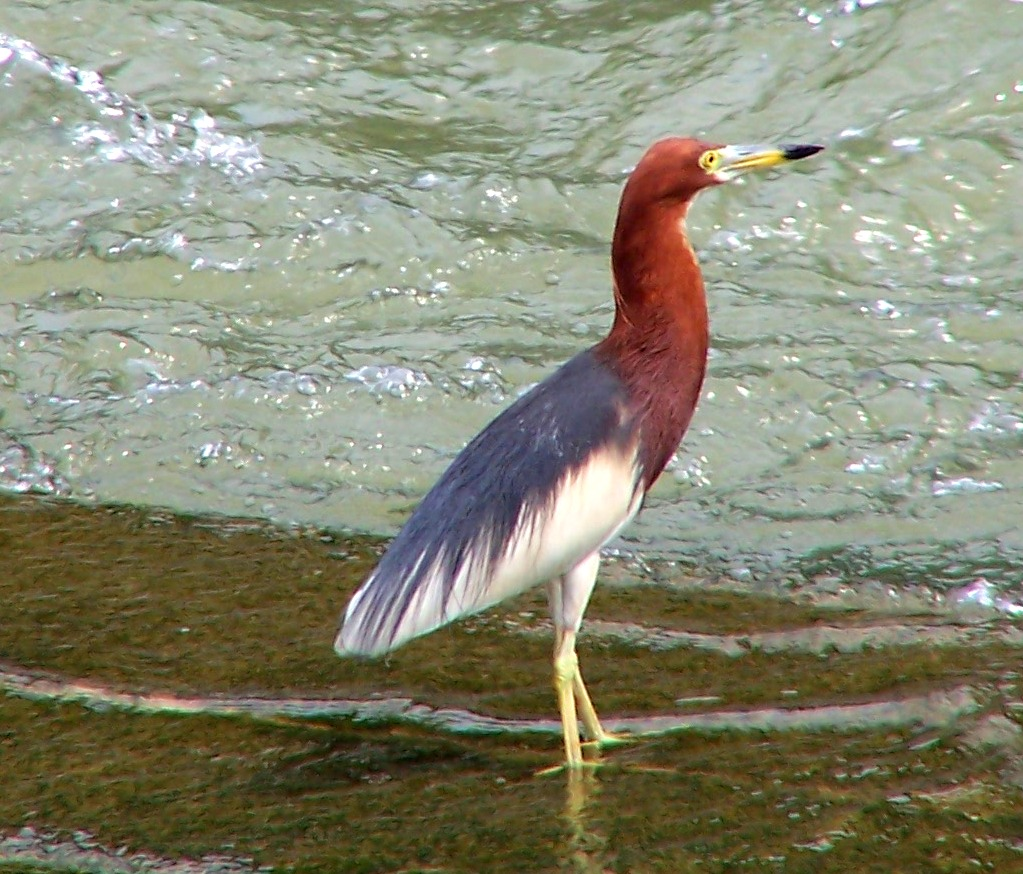
Chinese pond-heron

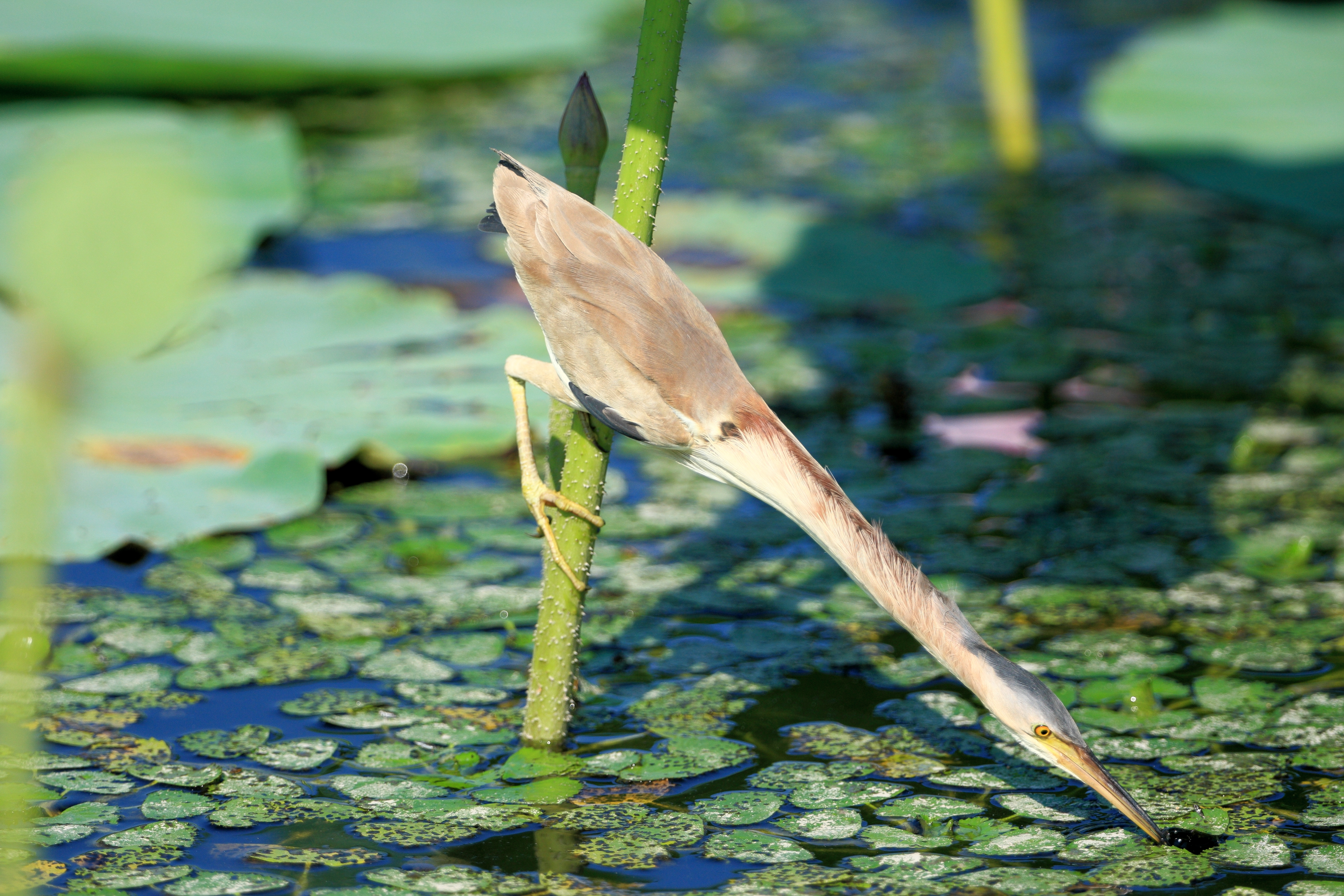
Yellow bittern

Order: Pelecaniformes Family: Ardeidae

The family Ardeidae contains the bitterns, herons and egrets. Herons and egrets are medium to large wading birds with long necks and legs. Bitterns tend to be shorter necked and more wary. Members of Ardeidae fly with their necks retracted, unlike other long-necked birds such as storks, ibises and spoonbills.

- Great bittern, Botaurus stellaris
- Yellow bittern, Ixobrychus sinensis
- Little bittern, Ixobrychus minutus
- Schrenck's bittern, Ixobrychus eurhythmus
- Cinnamon bittern, Ixobrychus cinnamomeus
- Black bittern, Ixobrychus flavicollis
- Gray heron, Ardea cinerea
- White-bellied heron, Ardea insignis
- Great-billed heron, Ardea sumatrana
- Purple heron, Ardea purpurea
- Great egret, Ardea alba
- Intermediate egret, Ardea intermedia
- White-faced heron, Egretta novaehollandiae (A)
- Chinese egret, Egretta eulophotes
- Little egret, Egretta garzetta
- Pacific reef-heron, Egretta sacra
- Pied heron, Egretta picata (A)
- Cattle egret, Bubulcus ibis
- Indian pond-heron, Ardeola grayii (A)
- Chinese pond-heron, Ardeola bacchus
- Striated heron, Butorides striata
- Black-crowned night-heron, Nycticorax nycticorax
- White-eared night-heron, Gorsachius magnificus
- Japanese night-heron, Gorsachius goisagi
- Malayan night-heron, Gorsachius melanolophus

== Ibises and spoonbills ==
Order: Pelecaniformes Family: Threskiornithidae

Threskiornithidae is a family of large terrestrial and wading birds which includes the ibises and spoonbills. They have long, broad wings with 11 primary and about 20 secondary feathers. They are strong fliers and despite their size and weight, very capable soarers.

- Glossy ibis, Plegadis falcinellus
- Black-headed ibis, Threskiornis melanocephalus
- White-shouldered ibis, Pseudibis davisoni (Ex?)
- Crested ibis, Nipponia nippon
- Eurasian spoonbill, Platalea leucorodia
- Black-faced spoonbill, Platalea minor

== Osprey ==
Order: Accipitriformes Family: Pandionidae

The family Pandionidae contains only one species, the osprey. The osprey is a medium-large raptor which is a specialist fish-eater with a worldwide distribution.

- Osprey, Pandion haliaetus

== Hawks, eagles, and kites ==
Order: Accipitriformes Family: Accipitridae

Accipitridae is a family of birds of prey, which includes hawks, eagles, kites, harriers and Old World vultures. These birds have powerful hooked beaks for tearing flesh from their prey, strong legs, powerful talons and keen eyesight.

- Black-winged kite, Elanus caeruleus
- Bearded vulture, Gypaetus barbatus
- Egyptian vulture, Neophron percnopterus (A)
- Oriental honey-buzzard, Pernis ptilorhynchus
- Jerdon's baza, Aviceda jerdoni
- Black baza, Aviceda leuphotes
- Red-headed vulture, Sarcogyps calvus
- Cinereous vulture, Aegypius monachus
- White-rumped vulture, Gyps bengalensis (Ex)
- Himalayan griffon, Gyps himalayensis
- Eurasian griffon, Gyps fulvus (A)
- Crested serpent-eagle, Spilornis cheela
- Short-toed snake-eagle, Circaetus gallicus
- Mountain hawk-eagle, Nisaetus nipalensis
- Rufous-bellied eagle, Lophotriorchis kienerii
- Black eagle, Ictinaetus malaiensis
- Greater spotted eagle, Clanga clanga
- Booted eagle, Hieraaetus pennatus
- Steppe eagle, Aquila nipalensis
- Imperial eagle, Aquila heliaca
- Golden eagle, Aquila chrysaetos
- Bonelli's eagle, Aquila fasciata
- White-eyed buzzard, Butastur teesa
- Rufous-winged buzzard, Butastur liventer
- Gray-faced buzzard, Butastur indicus
- Eurasian marsh harrier, Circus aeruginosus
- Eastern marsh harrier, Circus spilonotus
- Hen harrier, Circus cyaneus
- Pallid harrier, Circus macrourus
- Pied harrier, Circus melanoleucos
- Montagu's harrier, Circus pygargus
- Crested goshawk, Accipiter trivirgatus
- Shikra, Accipiter badius
- Chinese sparrowhawk, Accipiter soloensis
- Japanese sparrowhawk, Accipiter gularis
- Besra, Accipiter virgatus
- Eurasian sparrowhawk, Accipiter nisus
- Northern goshawk, Accipiter gentilis
- Black kite, Milvus migrans
- Brahminy kite, Haliastur indus
- White-tailed eagle, Haliaeetus albicilla
- Pallas's fish eagle, Haliaeetus leucoryphus
- Steller's sea eagle, Haliaeetus pelagicus (A)
- White-bellied sea eagle, Icthyophaga leucogaster
- Lesser fish eagle, Icthyophaga humilis (A)
- Rough-legged hawk, Buteo lagopus
- Common buzzard, Buteo buteo
- Himalayan buzzard, Buteo burmanicus
- Eastern buzzard, Buteo japonicus
- Long-legged buzzard, Buteo rufinus
- Upland buzzard, Buteo hemilasius

== Barn-owls ==
Order: Strigiformes Family: Tytonidae

Barn-owls are medium to large owls with large heads and characteristic heart-shaped faces. They have long strong legs with powerful talons.

- Australasian grass-owl, Tyto longimembris
- Eastern barn owl, Tyto javanica
- Oriental bay-owl, Phodilus badius

== Owls ==
Order: Strigiformes Family: Strigidae

The typical owls are small to large solitary nocturnal birds of prey. They have large forward-facing eyes and ears, a hawk-like beak and a conspicuous circle of feathers around each eye called a facial disk.

- Mountain scops-owl, Otus spilocephalus
- Collared scops-owl, Otus lettia
- Japanese scops-owl, Otus semitorques
- Eurasian scops-owl, Otus scops
- Pallid scops-owl, Otus brucei
- Oriental scops-owl, Otus sunia
- Eurasian eagle-owl, Bubo bubo
- Spot-bellied eagle-owl, Ketupa nipalensis
- Dusky eagle-owl, Ketupa coromanda (A)
- Snowy owl, Bubo scandiacus
- Blakiston's fish-owl, Ketupa blakistoni
- Brown fish-owl, Ketupa zeylonensis
- Tawny fish-owl, Ketupa flavipes
- Northern hawk owl, Surnia ulula
- Eurasian pygmy-owl, Glaucidium passerinum
- Asian barred owlet, Glaucidium cuculoides
- Collared owlet, Taenioptynx brodiei
- Spotted owlet, Athene brama
- Little owl, Athene noctua
- Brown wood-owl, Strix leptogrammica
- Tawny owl, Strix aluco
- Himalayan owl, Strix nivicolum
- Ural owl, Strix uralensis
- Great gray owl, Strix nebulosa
- Long-eared owl, Asio otus
- Short-eared owl, Asio flammeus
- Boreal owl, Aegolius funereus
- Brown boobook, Ninox scutulata
- Northern boobook, Ninox japonica

== Trogons ==
Order: Trogoniformes Family: Trogonidae

The family Trogonidae includes trogons and quetzals. Found in tropical woodlands worldwide, they feed on insects and fruit, and their broad bills and weak legs reflect their diet and arboreal habits. Although their flight is fast, they are reluctant to fly any distance. Trogons have soft, often colorful, feathers with distinctive male and female plumage.

- Red-headed trogon, Harpactes erythrocephalus
- Orange-breasted trogon, Harpactes oreskios
- Ward's trogon, Harpactes wardi

== Hoopoes ==
Order: Bucerotiformes Family: Upupidae

Hoopoes have black, white and orangey-pink coloring with a long crest on their head, the plumage of which sweeps backward at rest but can be flexed to an erect position.

- Eurasian hoopoe, Upupa epops

== Hornbills ==
Order: Bucerotiformes Family: Bucerotidae

Hornbills are a group of birds whose bill is shaped like a cow's horn, but without a twist, sometimes with a casque on the upper mandible. Frequently, the bill is brightly colored.

- Great hornbill, Buceros bicornis
- Brown hornbill, Anorrhinus austeni
- Oriental pied-hornbill, Anthracoceros albirostris
- Rufous-necked hornbill, Aceros nipalensis
- Wreathed hornbill, Rhyticeros undulatus

== Kingfishers ==
Order: Coraciiformes Family: Alcedinidae

Kingfishers are medium-sized birds with large heads, long, pointed bills, short legs and stubby tails.

- Blyth's kingfisher, Alcedo hercules
- Common kingfisher, Alcedo atthis
- Blue-eared kingfisher, Alcedo meninting
- Black-backed dwarf-kingfisher, Ceyx erithaca
- Stork-billed kingfisher, Pelargopsis capensis
- Ruddy kingfisher, Halcyon coromanda
- White-throated kingfisher, Halcyon smyrnensis
- Black-capped kingfisher, Halcyon pileata
- Collared kingfisher, Todiramphus chloris
- Crested kingfisher, Megaceryle lugubris
- Pied kingfisher, Ceryle rudis

== Bee-eaters ==
Order: Coraciiformes Family: Meropidae

The bee-eaters are a group of near passerine birds in the family Meropidae. Most species are found in Africa but others occur in southern Europe, Madagascar, Australia and New Guinea. They are characterized by richly colored plumage, slender bodies and usually elongated central tail feathers. All are colorful and have long downturned bills and pointed wings, which give them a swallow-like appearance when seen from afar.

- Blue-bearded bee-eater, Nyctyornis athertoni
- Asian green bee-eater, Merops orientalis
- Blue-throated bee-eater, Merops viridis
- Blue-cheeked bee-eater, Merops persicus (A)
- Blue-tailed bee-eater, Merops philippinus
- European bee-eater, Merops apiaster
- Chestnut-headed bee-eater, Merops leschenaulti

== Rollers ==
Order: Coraciiformes Family: Coraciidae

Rollers resemble crows in size and build, but are more closely related to the kingfishers and bee-eaters. They share the colorful appearance of those groups with blues and browns predominating. The two inner front toes are connected, but the outer toe is not.

- European roller, Coracias garrulus
- Indian roller, Coracias benghalensis (A)
- Indochinese roller, Coracias affinis
- Dollarbird, Eurystomus orientalis

== Asian barbets ==
Order: Piciformes Family: Megalaimidae

The Asian barbets are plump birds, with short necks and large heads. They get their name from the bristles which fringe their heavy bills. Most species are brightly colored.

- Coppersmith barbet, Psilopogon haemacephalus
- Blue-eared barbet, Psilopogon duvaucelii
- Great barbet, Psilopogon virens
- Green-eared barbet, Psilopogon faiostrictus
- Lineated barbet, Psilopogon lineatus
- Golden-throated barbet, Psilopogon franklinii
- Chinese barbet, Psilopogon faber (E)
- Blue-throated barbet, Psilopogon asiaticus

== Honeyguides ==
Order: Piciformes Family: Indicatoridae

Honeyguides are among the few birds that feed on wax. They are named for the greater honeyguide which leads traditional honey-hunters to bees' nests and, after the hunters have harvested the honey, feeds on the remaining contents of the hive.

- Yellow-rumped honeyguide, Indicator xanthonotus

== Woodpeckers ==
Order: Piciformes Family: Picidae

Woodpeckers are small to medium-sized birds with chisel-like beaks, short legs, stiff tails and long tongues used for capturing insects. Some species have feet with two toes pointing forward and two backward, while several species have only three toes. Many woodpeckers have the habit of tapping noisily on tree trunks with their beaks.

- Eurasian wryneck, Jynx torquilla
- Speckled piculet, Picumnus innominatus
- White-browed piculet, Sasia ochracea
- Eurasian three-toed woodpecker, Picoides tridactylus
- Gray-capped pygmy woodpecker, Yungipicus canicapillus
- Japanese pygmy woodpecker, Yungipicus kizuki
- Yellow-crowned woodpecker, Leiopicus mahrattensis
- Brown-fronted woodpecker, Dendrocoptes auriceps (A)
- Rufous-bellied woodpecker, Dendrocopos hyperythrus
- Fulvous-breasted woodpecker, Dendrocopos macei (A)
- Stripe-breasted woodpecker, Dendrocopos atratus
- White-backed woodpecker, Dendrocopos leucotos
- Darjeeling woodpecker, Dendrocopos darjellensis
- Great spotted woodpecker, Dendrocopos major
- White-winged woodpecker, Dendrocopos leucopterus
- Lesser spotted woodpecker, Dryobates minor
- Crimson-breasted woodpecker, Dryobates cathpharius
- Bay woodpecker, Blythipicus pyrrhotis
- Greater flameback, Chrysocolaptes guttacristatus
- Rufous woodpecker, Micropternus brachyurus
- Pale-headed woodpecker, Gecinulus grantia
- Common flameback, Dinopium javanense
- Lesser yellownape, Picus chlorolophus
- Streak-throated woodpecker, Picus xanthopygaeus
- Scaly-bellied woodpecker, Picus squamatus
- Red-collared woodpecker, Picus rabieri (A)
- Laced woodpecker, Picus vittatus
- Gray-headed woodpecker, Picus canus
- Greater yellownape, Chrysophlegma flavinucha
- Great slaty woodpecker, Mulleripicus pulverulentus
- White-bellied woodpecker, Dryocopus javensis
- Black woodpecker, Dryocopus martius

== Falcons and caracaras ==
Order: Falconiformes Family: Falconidae

Falconidae is a family of diurnal birds of prey. They differ from hawks, eagles and kites in that they kill with their beaks instead of their talons.

- Collared falconet, Microhierax caerulescens
- Pied falconet, Microhierax melanoleucos
- Lesser kestrel, Falco naumanni
- Eurasian kestrel, Falco tinnunculus
- Red-footed falcon, Falco vespertinus
- Amur falcon, Falco amurensis
- Merlin, Falco columbarius
- Eurasian hobby, Falco subbuteo
- Oriental hobby, Falco severus
- Saker falcon, Falco cherrug
- Gyrfalcon, Falco rusticolus (A)
- Peregrine falcon, Falco peregrinus
  - Barbary falcon, Falco peregrinus pelegrinoides

== Old world parrots ==
Order: Psittaciformes Family: Psittaculidae

Characteristic features of parrots include a strong curved bill, an upright stance, strong legs, and clawed zygodactyl feet. Many parrots are vividly colored, and some are multi-colored. In size they range from 8 cm (3.1 in) to 1 m (3.3 ft) in length. Old World parrots are found from Africa east across south and southeast Asia and Oceania to Australia and New Zealand.

- Blue-rumped parrot, Psittinus cyanurus (A)
- Alexandrine parakeet, Psittacula eupatria
- Rose-ringed parakeet, Psittacula krameri (I)
- Slaty-headed parakeet, Psittacula himalayana
- Gray-headed parakeet, Psittacula finschii
- Plum-headed parakeet, Psittacula cyanocephala
- Blossom-headed parakeet, Psittacula roseata
- Derbyan parakeet, Psittacula derbiana
- Red-breasted parakeet, Psittacula alexandri
- Vernal hanging-parrot, Loriculus vernalis

== Asian and Grauer's broadbills ==
Order: Passeriformes Family: Eurylaimidae

The broadbills are small, brightly colored birds, which feed on fruit and also take insects in flycatcher fashion, snapping their broad bills. Their habitat is canopies of wet forests.

- Long-tailed broadbill, Psarisomus dalhousiae
- Silver-breasted broadbill, Serilophus lunatus

== Pittas ==
Order: Passeriformes Family: Pittidae

Pittas are medium-sized by passerine standards and are stocky, with fairly long, strong legs, short tails and stout bills. Many, but not all, are brightly colored. They spend the majority of their time on wet forest floors, eating snails, insects and similar invertebrates.

- Eared pitta, Hydrornis phayrei
- Rusty-naped pitta, Hydrornis oatesi
- Blue-naped pitta, Hydrornis nipalensis
- Blue-rumped pitta, Hydrornis soror
- Blue pitta, Hydrornis cyaneus
- Indian pitta, Pitta brachyura
- Blue-winged pitta, Pitta moluccensis
- Fairy pitta, Pitta nympha
- Hooded pitta, Pitta sordida

== Cuckooshrikes ==
Order: Passeriformes Family: Campephagidae

The cuckooshrikes are small to medium-sized passerine birds. They are predominantly grayish with white and black, although some species are brightly colored.

- Gray-chinned minivet, Pericrocotus solaris
- Short-billed minivet, Pericrocotus brevirostris
- Long-tailed minivet, Pericrocotus ethologus
- Scarlet minivet, Pericrocotus flammeus
- Ryukyu minivet, Pericrocotus tegimae (A)
- Ashy minivet, Pericrocotus divaricatus
- Brown-rumped minivet, Pericrocotus cantonensis
- Rosy minivet, Pericrocotus roseus
- Large cuckooshrike, Coracina macei
- Black-winged cuckooshrike, Coracina melaschistos

== Vireos, shrike-babblers, and erpornis ==
Order: Passeriformes Family: Vireonidae

Most of the members of this family are found in the New World. However, the shrike-babblers and erpornis, which only slightly resemble the "true" vireos and greenlets, are found in South East Asia.

- Black-headed shrike-babbler, Pteruthius rufiventer
- White-browed shrike-babbler, Pteruthius aeralatus
- Green shrike-babbler, Pteruthius xanthochlorus
- Black-eared shrike-babbler, Pteruthius melanotis
- Clicking shrike-babbler, Pteruthius intermedius
- White-bellied erpornis, Erpornis zantholeuca

== Old World orioles ==
Order: Passeriformes Family: Oriolidae

The Old World orioles are colorful passerine birds. They are not related to the New World orioles.

- Eurasian golden oriole, Oriolus oriolus
- Indian golden oriole, Oriolus kundoo
- Black-naped oriole, Oriolus chinensis
- Slender-billed oriole, Oriolus tenuirostris
- Black-hooded oriole, Oriolus xanthornus
- Maroon oriole, Oriolus traillii
- Silver oriole, Oriolus mellianus

== Woodswallows, bellmagpies, and allies ==
Order: Passeriformes Family: Artamidae

The woodswallows are soft-plumaged, somber-colored passerine birds. They are smooth, agile flyers with moderately large, semi-triangular wings.

- Ashy woodswallow, Artamus fuscus

== Vangas, helmetshrikes, and allies ==
Order: Passeriformes Family: Vangidae

The family Vangidae is highly variable, though most members of it resemble true shrikes to some degree.

- Large woodshrike, Tephrodornis virgatus
- Common woodshrike, Tephrodornis pondicerianus
- Bar-winged flycatcher-shrike, Hemipus picatus

== Ioras ==
Order: Passeriformes Family: Aegithinidae

The ioras are bulbul-like birds of open forest or thorn scrub, but whereas that group tends to be drab in coloration, ioras are sexually dimorphic, with the males being brightly plumaged in yellows and greens.

- Common iora, Aegithina tiphia
- Great iora, Aegithina lafresnayei

== Fantails ==
Order: Passeriformes Family: Rhipiduridae

The fantails are small insectivorous birds which are specialist aerial feeders.

- White-throated fantail, Rhipidura albicollis
- White-browed fantail, Rhipidura aureola

== Drongos ==
Order: Passeriformes Family: Dicruridae

The drongos are mostly black or dark gray in color, sometimes with metallic tints. They have long forked tails, and some Asian species have elaborate tail decorations. They have short legs and sit very upright when perched, like a shrike. They flycatch or take prey from the ground.

- Black drongo, Dicrurus macrocercus
- Ashy drongo, Dicrurus leucophaeus
- Crow-billed drongo, Dicrurus annectens
- Bronzed drongo, Dicrurus aeneus
- Lesser racket-tailed drongo, Dicrurus remifer
- Hair-crested drongo, Dicrurus hottentottus
- Greater racket-tailed drongo, Dicrurus paradiseus

== Monarch flycatchers ==
Order: Passeriformes Family: Monarchidae

The monarch flycatchers are small to medium-sized insectivorous passerines which hunt by flycatching.

- Black-naped monarch, Hypothymis azurea
- Japanese paradise-flycatcher, Terpsiphone atrocaudata
- Amur paradise-flycatcher, Terpsiphone incei
- Blyth's paradise-flycatcher, Terpsiphone affinis
- Indian paradise flycatcher, Terpsiphone paradisi

== Shrikes ==
Order: Passeriformes Family: Laniidae

Shrikes are passerine birds known for their habit of catching other birds and small animals and impaling the uneaten portions of their bodies on thorns. A typical shrike's beak is hooked, like a bird of prey.

- Tiger shrike, Lanius tigrinus
- Bull-headed shrike, Lanius bucephalus
- Red-backed shrike, Lanius collurio
- Red-tailed shrike, Lanius phoenicuroides
- Isabelline shrike, Lanius isabellinus
- Brown shrike, Lanius cristatus
- Burmese shrike, Lanius collurioides
- Bay-backed shrike, Lanius vittatus (A)
- Long-tailed shrike, Lanius schach
- Gray-backed shrike, Lanius tephronotus
- Northern shrike, Lanius borealis
- Great gray shrike, Lanius excubitor
- Lesser gray shrike, Lanius minor
- Chinese gray shrike, Lanius sphenocercus
- Giant shrike, Lanius giganteus (E)

== Crows, jays, and magpies ==
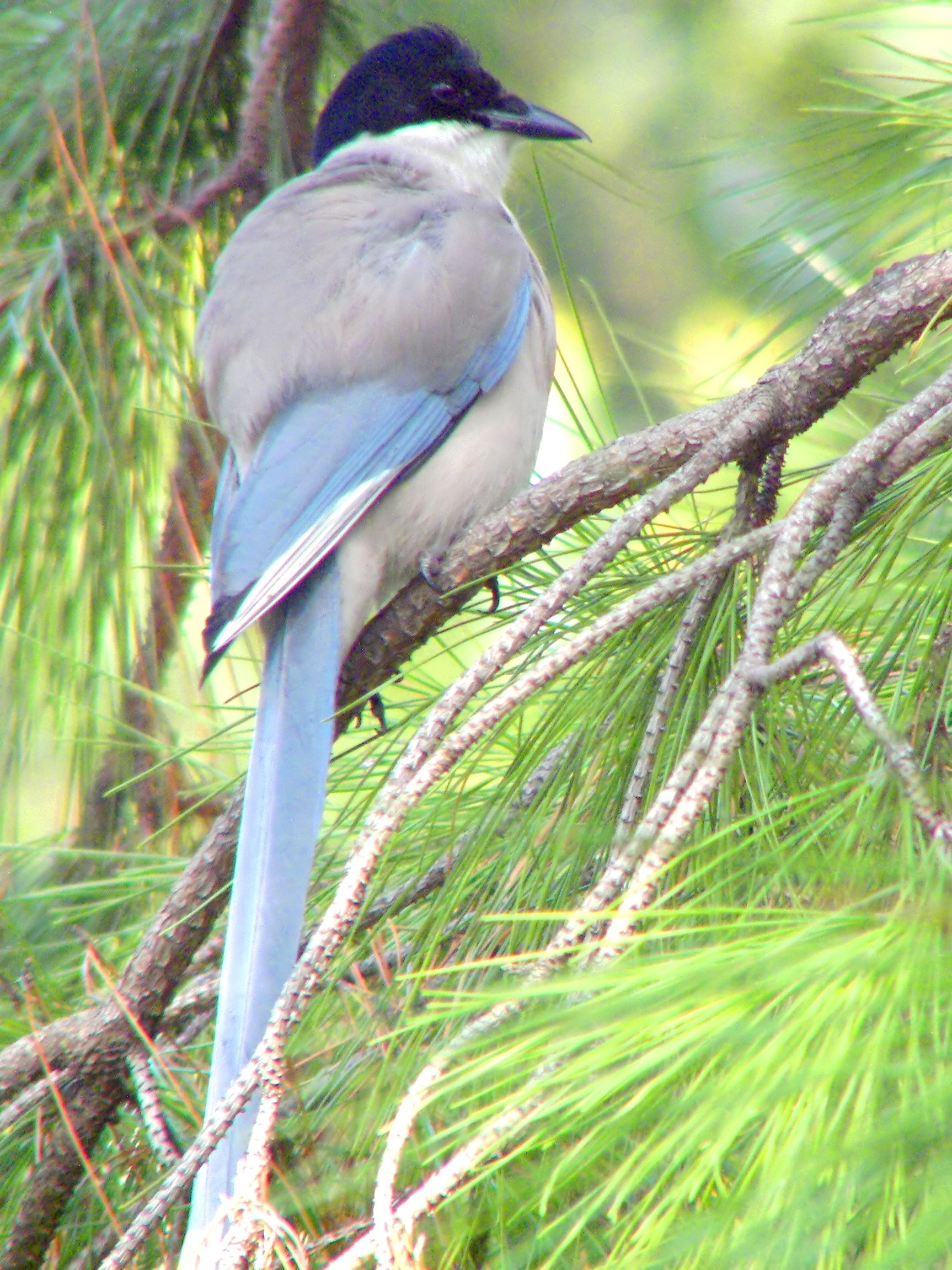
Azure-winged magpie

Order: Passeriformes Family: Corvidae

The family Corvidae includes crows, ravens, jays, choughs, magpies, treepies, nutcrackers and ground jays. Corvids are above average in size among the Passeriformes, and some of the larger species show high levels of intelligence. China has the greatest diversity of corvids of any country.

- Siberian jay, Perisoreus infaustus
- Sichuan jay, Perisoreus internigrans (E)
- Eurasian jay, Garrulus glandarius
- Azure-winged magpie, Cyanopica cyanus
- Yellow-billed blue-magpie, Urocissa flavirostris
- Red-billed blue-magpie, Urocissa erythroryncha
- White-winged magpie, Urocissa whiteheadi
- Common green-magpie, Cissa chinensis
- Indochinese green-magpie, Cissa hypoleuca
- Rufous treepie, Dendrocitta vagabunda
- Gray treepie, Dendrocitta formosae
- Collared treepie, Dendrocitta frontalis
- Ratchet-tailed treepie, Temnurus temnurus
- Black-rumped magpie, Pica bottanensis
- Oriental magpie, Pica serica
- Eurasian magpie, Pica pica
- Mongolian ground-jay, Podoces hendersoni
- Xinjiang ground-jay, Podoces biddulphi (E)
- Eurasian nutcracker, Nucifraga caryocatactes
- Red-billed chough, Pyrrhocorax pyrrhocorax
- Yellow-billed chough, Pyrrhocorax graculus
- Eurasian jackdaw, Corvus monedula
- Daurian jackdaw, Corvus dauuricus
- House crow, Corvus splendens
- Rook, Corvus frugilegus
- Carrion crow, Corvus corone
- Hooded crow, Corvus cornix
- Large-billed crow, Corvus macrorhynchos
- Collared crow, Corvus torquatus
- Common raven, Corvus corax

== Fairy flycatchers ==
Order: Passeriformes Family: Stenostiridae

Most of the species of this small family are found in Africa, though a few inhabit tropical Asia. They are not closely related to other birds called "flycatchers".

- Yellow-bellied fairy-fantail, Chelidorhynx hypoxanthus
- Gray-headed canary-flycatcher, Culicicapa ceylonensis

== Tits, chickadees, and titmice ==
Order: Passeriformes Family: Paridae

The Paridae are mainly small stocky woodland species with short stout bills. Some have crests. They are adaptable birds, with a mixed diet including seeds and insects. China has the greatest diversity of tits of any country.

- Fire-capped tit, Cephalopyrus flammiceps
- Yellow-browed tit, Sylviparus modestus
- Sultan tit, Melanochlora sultanea
- Coal tit, Periparus ater
- Rufous-naped tit, Periparus rufonuchalis
- Rufous-vented tit, Periparus rubidiventris
- Yellow-bellied tit, Periparus venustulus (E)
- Gray-crested tit, Lophophanes dichrous
- Varied tit, Sittiparus varius
- White-browed tit, Poecile superciliosus (E)
- Pere David's tit, Poecile davidi (E)
- Marsh tit, Poecile palustris
- Black-bibbed tit, Poecile hypermelaenus
- Willow tit, Poecile montanus
- Sichuan tit, Poecile weigoldicus
- Gray-headed chickadee, Poecile cinctus (A)
- Azure tit, Cyanistes cyanus
- Ground tit, Pseudopodoces humilis
- Green-backed tit, Parus monticolus
- Great tit, Parus major
- Cinereous tit, Parus cinereus
- Japanese tit, Parus minor
- Himalayan black-lored tit, Machlolophus xanthogenys (A)
- Yellow-cheeked tit, Machlolophus spilonotus

== Penduline-tits ==
Order: Passeriformes Family: Remizidae

The penduline-tits are a group of small passerine birds related to the true tits. They are insectivores.

- Black-headed penduline-tit, Remiz coronatus (A)
- White-crowned penduline-tit, Remiz coronatus
- Chinese penduline-tit, Remiz consobrinus

== Larks ==
Order: Passeriformes Family: Alaudidae

Larks are small terrestrial birds with often extravagant songs and display flights. Most larks are fairly dull in appearance. Their food is insects and seeds.

- Horsfield's bushlark, Mirafra javanica
- Horned lark, Eremophila alpestris
- Greater short-toed lark, Calandrella brachydactyla
- Mongolian short-toed lark, Calandrella dukhunensis
- Hume's lark, Calandrella acutirostris
- Bimaculated lark, Melanocorypha bimaculata
- Calandra lark, Melanocorypha calandra (A)
- Tibetan lark, Melanocorypha maxima
- Black lark, Melanocorypha yeltoniensis (A)
- Mongolian lark, Melanocorypha mongolica
- Asian short-toed lark, Alaudala cheleensis
- Turkestan short-toed lark, Alaudala heinei (A)
- White-winged lark, Alauda leucoptera (A)
- Eurasian skylark, Alauda arvensis
- Oriental skylark, Alauda gulgula
- Crested lark, Galerida cristata

== Bearded reedling ==
Order: Passeriformes Family: Panuridae

This species, the only one in its family, is found in reed beds throughout temperate Europe and Asia.

- Bearded reedling, Panurus biarmicus

== Cisticolas and allies ==
Order: Passeriformes Family: Cisticolidae

The Cisticolidae are warblers found mainly in warmer southern regions of the Old World. They are generally very small birds of drab brown or gray appearance found in open country such as grassland or scrub.

- Common tailorbird, Orthotomus sutorius
- Dark-necked tailorbird, Orthotomus atrogularis
- Himalayan prinia, Prinia crinigera
- Striped prinia, Prinia striata
- Black-throated prinia, Prinia atrogularis
- Hill prinia, Prinia superciliaris
- Rufescent prinia, Prinia rufescens
- Gray-breasted prinia, Prinia hodgsonii
- Yellow-bellied prinia, Prinia flaviventris
- Plain prinia, Prinia inornata
- Zitting cisticola, Cisticola juncidis
- Golden-headed cisticola, Cisticola exilis

== Reed warblers and allies ==
Order: Passeriformes Family: Acrocephalidae

The members of this family are usually rather large for "warblers". Most are rather plain olivaceous brown above with much yellow to beige below. They are usually found in open woodland, reedbeds, or tall grass. The family occurs mostly in southern to western Eurasia and surroundings, but it also ranges far into the Pacific, with some species in Africa.

- Thick-billed warbler, Arundinax aedon
- Booted warbler, Iduna caligata
- Sykes's warbler, Iduna rama
- Eastern olivaceous warbler, Iduna pallida
- Black-browed reed warbler, Acrocephalus bistrigiceps
- Streaked reed warbler, Acrocephalus sorghophilus
- Moustached warbler, Acrocephalus melanopogon (A)
- Sedge warbler, Acrocephalus schoenobaenus
- Paddyfield warbler, Acrocephalus agricola
- Blunt-winged warbler, Acrocephalus concinens
- Manchurian reed warbler, Acrocephalus tangorum
- Blyth's reed warbler, Acrocephalus dumetorum
- Eurasian reed warbler, Acrocephalus scirpaceus
- Great reed warbler, Acrocephalus arundinaceus
- Oriental reed warbler, Acrocephalus orientalis
- Clamorous reed warbler, Acrocephalus stentoreus

== Grassbirds and allies ==
Order: Passeriformes Family: Locustellidae

Locustellidae are a family of small insectivorous songbirds found mainly in Eurasia, Africa, and the Australian region. They are smallish birds with tails that are usually long and pointed, and tend to be drab brownish or buffy all over.

- Gray's grasshopper warbler, Helopsaltes fasciolatus
- Marsh grassbird, Helopsaltes pryeri
- Pallas's grasshopper warbler, Helopsaltes certhiola
- Middendorff's grasshopper warbler, Helopsaltes ochotensis
- Pleske's grasshopper warbler, Helopsaltes pleskei
- Lanceolated warbler, Locustella lanceolata
- Savi's warbler, Locustella luscinioides
- Brown bush warbler, Locustella luteoventris
- Common grasshopper-warbler, Locustella naevia
- Long-billed bush warbler, Locustella major
- Chinese bush warbler, Locustella tacsanowskia
- Baikal bush warbler, Locustella davidi
- Spotted bush warbler, Locustella thoracica
- Russet bush warbler, Locustella mandelli
- Sichuan bush warbler, Locustella chengi
- Striated grassbird, Megalurus palustris

== Cupwings ==
Order: Passeriformes Family: Pnoepygidae

The members of this small family are found in mountainous parts of South and South East Asia.

- Scaly-breasted cupwing, Pnoepyga albiventer
- Immaculate cupwing, Pnoepyga immaculata (A)
- Pygmy cupwing, Pnoepyga pusilla

== Swallows ==
Order: Passeriformes Family: Hirundinidae

The family Hirundinidae is adapted to aerial feeding. They have a slender streamlined body, long pointed wings and a short bill with a wide gape. The feet are adapted to perching rather than walking, and the front toes are partially joined at the base.

- Gray-throated martin, Riparia chinensis
- Bank swallow, Riparia riparia
- Pale sand martin, Riparia diluta
- Eurasian crag-martin, Ptyonoprogne rupestris
- Dusky crag-martin, Ptyonoprogne concolor (A)
- Barn swallow, Hirundo rustica
- Wire-tailed swallow, Hirundo smithii
- Pacific swallow, Hirundo tahitica (A)
- Red-rumped swallow, Cecropis daurica
- Striated swallow, Cecropis striolata
- Streak-throated swallow, Petrochelidon fluvicola (A)
- Common house-martin, Delichon urbicum
- Asian house-martin, Delichon dasypus
- Nepal house-martin, Delichon nipalense

== Bulbuls ==
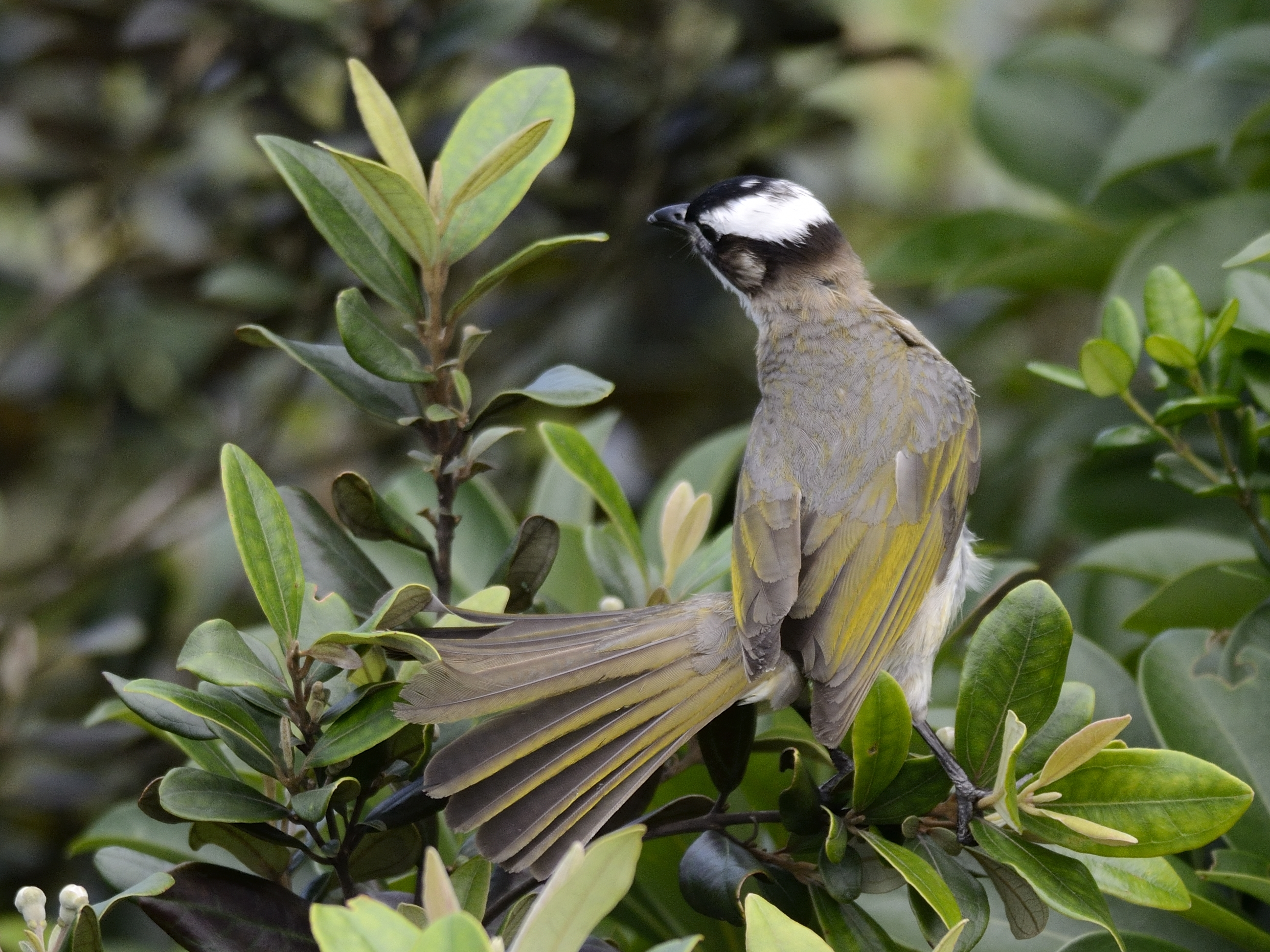
Light-vented bulbul

Order: Passeriformes Family: Pycnonotidae

Bulbuls are medium-sized songbirds. Some are colorful with yellow, red or orange vents, cheeks, throats or supercilia, but most are drab, with uniform olive-brown to black plumage. Some species have distinct crests.

- Black-headed bulbul, Brachypodius melanocephalos
- Black-crested bulbul, Rubigula flaviventris
- Crested finchbill, Spizixos canifrons
- Collared finchbill, Spizixos semitorques
- Striated bulbul, Alcurus striatus
- Red-vented bulbul, Pycnonotus cafer
- Red-whiskered bulbul, Pycnonotus jocosus
- Brown-breasted bulbul, Pycnonotus xanthorrhous
- Light-vented bulbul, Pycnonotus sinensis
- Himalayan bulbul, Pycnonotus leucogenys (A)
- Sooty-headed bulbul, Pycnonotus aurigaster
- Stripe-throated bulbul, Pycnonotus finlaysoni
- Flavescent bulbul, Pycnonotus flavescens
- White-throated bulbul, Alophoixus flaveolus
- Puff-throated bulbul, Alophoixus pallidus
- Gray-eyed bulbul, Iole propinqua
- Black bulbul, Hypsipetes leucocephalus
- Brown-eared bulbul, Hypsipetes amaurotis
- Ashy bulbul, Hemixos flavala
- Chestnut bulbul, Hemixos castanonotus
- Mountain bulbul, Ixos mcclellandii

== Leaf warblers ==
Order: Passeriformes Family: Phylloscopidae

Leaf warblers are a family of small insectivorous birds found mostly in Eurasia and ranging into Wallacea and Africa. The species are of various sizes, often green-plumaged above and yellow below, or more subdued with greyish-green to greyish-brown colors.

- Wood warbler, Phylloscopus sibilatrix (A)
- Ashy-throated warbler, Phylloscopus maculipennis
- Buff-barred warbler, Phylloscopus pulcher
- Yellow-browed warbler, Phylloscopus inornatus
- Hume's warbler, Phylloscopus humei
- Chinese leaf warbler, Phylloscopus yunnanensis
- Pallas's leaf warbler, Phylloscopus proregulus
- Gansu leaf-warbler, Phylloscopus kansuensis (E)
- Lemon-rumped warbler, Phylloscopus chloronotus
- Sichuan leaf warbler, Phylloscopus forresti
- Radde's warbler, Phylloscopus schwarzi
- Yellow-streaked warbler, Phylloscopus armandii
- Sulphur-bellied warbler, Phylloscopus griseolus
- Tickell's leaf warbler, Phylloscopus affinis
- Dusky warbler, Phylloscopus fuscatus
- Smoky warbler, Phylloscopus fuligiventer
- Buff-throated warbler, Phylloscopus subaffinis
- Willow warbler, Phylloscopus trochilus (A)
- Mountain chiffchaff, Phylloscopus sindianus
- Common chiffchaff, Phylloscopus collybita
- Eastern crowned warbler, Phylloscopus coronatus
- White-spectacled warbler, Phylloscopus intermedius
- Gray-cheeked warbler, Phylloscopus poliogenys
- Green-crowned warbler, Phylloscopus burkii
- Gray-crowned warbler, Phylloscopus tephrocephalus
- Whistler's warbler, Phylloscopus whistleri
- Bianchi's warbler, Phylloscopus valentini
- Martens's warbler, Phylloscopus omeiensis (E)
- Alström's warbler, Phylloscopus soror
- Greenish warbler, Phylloscopus trochiloides
- Two-barred warbler, Phylloscopus plumbeitarsus
- Emei leaf warbler, Phylloscopus emeiensis (E)
- Large-billed leaf warbler, Phylloscopus magnirostris
- Pale-legged leaf warbler, Phylloscopus tenellipes
- Sakhalin leaf warbler, Phylloscopus borealoides (A)
- Japanese leaf warbler, Phylloscopus xanthodryas
- Arctic warbler, Phylloscopus borealis
- Kamchatka leaf warbler, Phylloscopus examinandus
- Chestnut-crowned warbler, Phylloscopus castaniceps
- Limestone leaf warbler, Phylloscopus calciatilis
- Yellow-vented warbler, Phylloscopus cantator
- Sulphur-breasted warbler, Phylloscopus ricketti
- Blyth's leaf warbler, Phylloscopus reguloides
- Claudia's leaf warbler, Phylloscopus claudiae
- Hartert's leaf warbler, Phylloscopus goodsoni (E)
- Gray-hooded warbler, Phylloscopus xanthoschistos
- Davison's leaf warbler, Phylloscopus intensior
- Hainan leaf warbler, Phylloscopus hainanus (E)
- Kloss's leaf warbler, Phylloscopus ogilviegranti

== Bush warblers and allies ==
Order: Passeriformes Family: Scotocercidae

The members of this family are found throughout Africa, Asia, and Polynesia. Their taxonomy is in flux, and some authorities place some genera in other families.

- Pale-footed bush warbler, Hemitesia pallidipes
- Asian stubtail, Urosphena squameiceps
- Gray-bellied tesia, Tesia cyaniventer
- Slaty-bellied tesia, Tesia olivea
- Chestnut-crowned bush warbler, Cettia major
- Gray-sided bush warbler, Cettia brunnifrons
- Chestnut-headed tesia, Cettia castaneocoronata
- Cetti's warbler, Cettia cetti
- Yellow-bellied warbler, Abroscopus superciliaris
- Rufous-faced warbler, Abroscopus albogularis
- Black-faced warbler, Abroscopus schisticeps
- Mountain tailorbird, Phyllergates cucullatus
- Broad-billed warbler, Tickellia hodgsoni
- Japanese bush warbler, Horornis diphone (A)
- Manchurian bush warbler, Horornis borealis
- Brownish-flanked bush warbler, Horornis fortipes
- Hume's bush warbler, Horornis brunnescens
- Yellowish-bellied bush warbler, Horornis acanthizoides
- Aberrant bush warbler, Horornis flavolivaceus

== Long-tailed tits ==
Order: Passeriformes Family: Aegithalidae

Long-tailed tits are a group of small passerine birds with medium to long tails. They make woven bag nests in trees. Most eat a mixed diet which includes insects.

- White-browed tit-warbler, Leptopoecile sophiae
- Crested tit-warbler, Leptopoecile elegans (E)
- Long-tailed tit, Aegithalos caudatus
- Silver-throated tit, Aegithalos glaucogularis (E)
- Black-throated tit, Aegithalos concinnus
- Black-browed tit, Aegithalos iouschistos
- Sooty tit, Aegithalos fuliginosus (E)

== Sylviid warblers, parrotbills, and allies ==
Order: Passeriformes Family: Sylviidae

The family Sylviidae is a group of small insectivorous passerine birds. They mainly occur as breeding species, as the common name implies, in Europe, Asia and, to a lesser extent, Africa. Most are of generally undistinguished appearance, but many have distinctive songs.

- Eurasian blackcap, Sylvia atricapilla (A)
- Barred warbler, Curruca nisoria
- Lesser whitethroat, Curruca curruca
- Asian desert warbler, Curruca nana
- Greater whitethroat, Curruca communis
- Fire-tailed myzornis, Myzornis pyrrhoura
- Rufous-tailed babbler, Moupinia poecilotis (E)
- Golden-breasted fulvetta, Lioparus chrysotis
- Yellow-eyed babbler, Chrysomma sinense
- Tarim babbler, Rhopophilus albosuperciliaris (E)
- Beijing babbler, Rhopophilus pekinensis
- Spectacled fulvetta, Fulvetta ruficapilla
- Chinese fulvetta, Fulvetta striaticollis (E)
- Brown-throated fulvetta, Fulvetta ludlowi
- White-browed fulvetta, Fulvetta vinipectus
- Streak-throated fulvetta, Fulvetta manipurensis
- Gray-hooded fulvetta, Fulvetta cinereiceps
- Reed parrotbill, Calamornis heudei
- Spot-breasted parrotbill, Paradoxornis guttaticollis
- Great parrotbill, Conostoma aemodium
- Brown parrotbill, Cholornis unicolor
- Three-toed parrotbill, Cholornis paradoxus (E)
- Gray-headed parrotbill, Psittiparus gularis
- White-breasted parrotbill, Psittiparus ruficeps
- Rufous-headed parrotbill, Psittiparus bakeri
- Short-tailed parrotbill, Neosuthora davidianus
- Fulvous parrotbill, Suthora fulvifrons
- Black-throated parrotbill, Suthora nipalensis
- Golden parrotbill, Suthora verreauxi
- Pale-billed parrotbill, Chleuasicus atrosuperciliaris
- Spectacled parrotbill, Sinosuthora conspicillata (E)
- Gray-hooded parrotbill, Sinosuthora zappeyi (E)
- Brown-winged parrotbill, Sinosuthora brunnea
- Vinous-throated parrotbill, Sinosuthora webbiana
- Ashy-throated parrotbill, Sinosuthora alphonsiana
- Rusty-throated parrotbill, Sinosuthora przewalskii (E)

== White-eyes, yuhinas, and allies ==
Order: Passeriformes Family: Zosteropidae

The white-eyes are small and mostly undistinguished, their plumage above being generally some dull color like greenish-olive, but some species have a white or bright yellow throat, breast or lower parts, and several have buff flanks. As their name suggests, many species have a white ring around each eye.

- White-collared yuhina, Parayuhina diademata
- Striated yuhina, Staphida castaniceps
- Indochinese yuhina, Staphida torqueola
- Black-chinned yuhina, Yuhina nigrimenta
- Whiskered yuhina, Yuhina flavicollis
- White-naped yuhina, Yuhina bakeri
- Stripe-throated yuhina, Yuhina gularis
- Rufous-vented yuhina, Yuhina occipitalis
- Chestnut-flanked white-eye, Zosterops erythropleurus
- Swinhoe's white-eye, Zosterops simplex
- Warbling white-eye, Zosterops japonicus
- Indian white-eye, Zosterops palpebrosus

== Tree-babblers, scimitar-babblers, and allies ==
Order: Passeriformes Family: Timaliidae

The babblers, or timaliids, are somewhat diverse in size and coloration, but are characterized by soft fluffy plumage.

- Chestnut-capped babbler, Timalia pileata
- Pin-striped tit-babbler, Macronus gularis
- Golden babbler, Cyanoderma chrysaeum
- Black-chinned babbler, Cyanoderma pyrrhops (A)
- Rufous-capped babbler, Cyanoderma ruficeps
- Buff-chested babbler, Cyanoderma ambiguum
- Bar-winged wren-babbler, Spelaeornis troglodytoides
- Pale-throated wren-babbler, Spelaeornis kinneari
- Gray-bellied wren-babbler, Spelaeornis reptatus
- Coral-billed scimitar-babbler, Pomatorhinus ferruginosus
- Red-billed scimitar-babbler, Pomatorhinus ochraceiceps
- Slender-billed scimitar-babbler, Pomatorhinus superciliaris
- Streak-breasted scimitar-babbler, Pomatorhinus ruficollis
- Large scimitar-babbler, Erythrogenys hypoleucos
- Rusty-cheeked scimitar-babbler, Erythrogenys erythrogenys
- Black-streaked scimitar-babbler, Erythrogenys gravivox
- Gray-sided scimitar-babbler, Erythrogenys swinhoei
- Gray-throated babbler, Stachyris nigriceps
- Nonggang babbler, Stachyris nonggangensis (E)
- Sikkim wedge-billed babbler, Stachyris humei (A)
- Cachar wedge-billed babbler, Stachyris roberti
- Spot-necked babbler, Stachyris striolata

== Ground babblers and allies ==
Order: Passeriformes Family: Pellorneidae

These small to medium-sized songbirds have soft fluffy plumage but are otherwise rather diverse. Members of the genus Illadopsis are found in forests, but some other genera are birds of scrublands.

- Chinese grassbird, Graminicola striatus
- White-hooded babbler, Gampsorhynchus rufulus
- Collared babbler, Gampsorhynchus torquatus
- Yellow-throated fulvetta, Schoeniparus cinereus
- Rufous-winged fulvetta, Schoeniparus castaneceps
- Gold-fronted fulvetta, Schoeniparus variegaticeps (E)
- Rufous-throated fulvetta, Schoeniparus rufogularis
- Rusty-capped fulvetta, Schoeniparus dubius
- Dusky fulvetta, Schoeniparus brunneus
- Puff-throated babbler, Pellorneum ruficeps
- Spot-throated babbler, Pellorneum albiventre
- Buff-breasted babbler, Pellorneum tickelli
- Streaked wren-babbler, Gypsophila brevicaudatus
- Annam limestone babbler, Gypsophila annamensis
- Eyebrowed wren-babbler, Napothera epilepidota
- Long-billed wren-babbler, Napothera malacoptila
- Naung Mung scimitar-babbler, Napothera naungmungensis (A)

== Laughingthrushes and allies ==
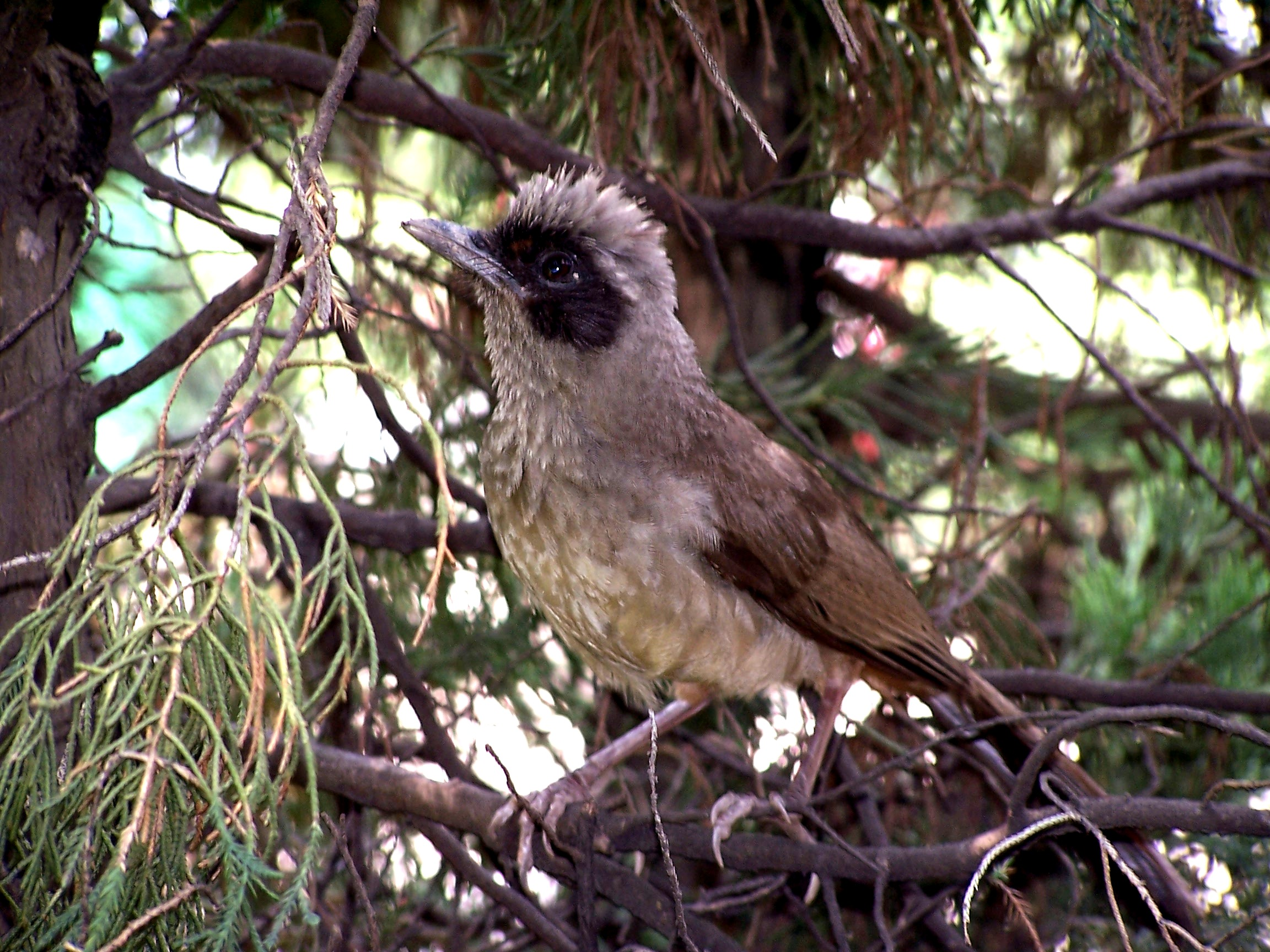
Masked laughingthrush

Order: Passeriformes Family: Leiothrichidae

The members of this family are diverse in size and colouration, though those of genus Turdoides tend to be brown or greyish. The family is found in Africa, India, and southeast Asia.

- Brown-cheeked fulvetta, Alcippe poioicephala
- Nepal fulvetta, Alcippe nipalensis
- David's fulvetta, Alcippe davidi
- Huet's fulvetta, Alcippe hueti
- Yunnan fulvetta, Alcippe fratercula
- Striated laughingthrush, Grammatoptila striata
- Himalayan cutia, Cutia nipalensis
- Scaly laughingthrush, Trochalopteron subunicolor
- Blue-winged laughingthrush, Trochalopteron squamatum
- Streaked laughingthrush, Trochalopteron lineatum
- Bhutan laughingthrush, Trochalopteron imbricatum
- Variegated laughingthrush, Trochalopteron variegatum (A)
- Black-faced laughingthrush, Trochalopteron affine
- Prince Henry's laughingthrush, Trochalopteron henrici
- Elliot's laughingthrush, Trochalopteron elliotii (E)
- Red-tailed laughingthrush, Trochalopteron milnei
- Chestnut-crowned laughingthrush, Trochalopteron erythrocephalum
- Assam laughingthrush, Trochalopteron chrysopterum
- Red-winged laughingthrush, Trochalopteron formosum
- Silver-eared laughingthrush, Trochalopteron melanostigma
- Long-tailed sibia, Heterophasia picaoides
- Rufous sibia, Heterophasia capistrata
- Beautiful sibia, Heterophasia pulchella
- Gray sibia, Heterophasia gracilis
- Black-backed sibia, Heterophasia melanoleuca
- Black-headed sibia, Heterophasia desgodinsi
- Hoary-throated barwing, Actinodura nipalensis
- Streak-throated barwing, Actinodura waldeni
- Streaked barwing, Actinodura souliei
- Blue-winged minla, Actinodura cyanouroptera
- Chestnut-tailed minla, Actinodura strigula
- Rusty-fronted barwing, Actinodura egertoni
- Spectacled barwing, Actinodura ramsayi
- Red-billed leiothrix, Leiothrix lutea
- Silver-eared mesia, Leiothrix argentauris
- Red-tailed minla, Minla ignotincta
- Rufous-backed sibia, Leioptila annectens
- Gray-faced liocichla, Liocichla omeiensis (E)
- Red-faced liocichla, Liocichla phoenicea
- Scarlet-faced liocichla, Liocichla ripponi
- Spot-breasted laughingthrush, Garrulax merulinus
- Chinese hwamei, Garrulax canorus
- Lesser necklaced laughingthrush, Garrulax monileger
- White-crested laughingthrush, Garrulax leucolophus
- White-necked laughingthrush, Garrulax strepitans
- Gray laughingthrush, Garrulax maesi
- Rufous-cheeked laughingthrush, Garrulax castanotis
- Snowy-cheeked laughingthrush, Ianthocincla sukatschewi (E)
- Rufous-chinned laughingthrush, Ianthocincla rufogularis (A)
- Moustached laughingthrush, Ianthocincla cineracea
- Spotted laughingthrush, Ianthocincla ocellata
- Giant laughingthrush, Ianthocincla maxima (E)
- Biet's laughingthrush, Ianthocincla bieti (E)
- Barred laughingthrush, Ianthocincla lunulata (E)
- Rufous-vented laughingthrush, Pterorhinus gularis (A)
- Blue-crowned laughingthrush, Pterorhinus courtoisi (E)
- Rufous-necked laughingthrush, Pterorhinus ruficollis
- Black-throated laughingthrush, Pterorhinus chinensis
- White-browed laughingthrush, Pterorhinus sannio
- Masked laughingthrush, Pterorhinus perspicillatus
- Greater necklaced laughingthrush, Pterorhinus pectoralis
- Pere David's laughingthrush, Pterorhinus davidi (E)
- Chinese babax, Pterorhinus lanceolatus
- Giant babax, Pterorhinus waddelli
- Tibetan babax, Pterorhinus koslowi (E)
- White-throated laughingthrush, Pterorhinus albogularis
- Gray-sided laughingthrush, Pterorhinus caerulatus
- Buffy laughingthrush, Pterorhinus berthemyi

== Kinglets ==
Order: Passeriformes Family: Regulidae

The kinglets, also called crests, are a small group of birds often included in the Old World warblers, but frequently given family status because they also resemble the titmice.

- Goldcrest, Regulus regulus

== Wallcreeper ==
Order: Passeriformes Family: Tichodromidae

The wallcreeper is a small bird, with stunning crimson, gray and black plumage, related to the nuthatch family.

- Wallcreeper, Tichodroma muraria

== Nuthatches ==
Order: Passeriformes Family: Sittidae

Nuthatches are small woodland birds. They have the unusual ability to climb down trees head first, unlike other birds which can only go upwards. Nuthatches have big heads, short tails and powerful bills and feet. China has the greatest diversity of nuthatches of any country.

- Chestnut-bellied nuthatch, Sitta castanea
- Burmese nuthatch, Sitta neglecta
- Eurasian nuthatch, Sitta europaea
- Chestnut-vented nuthatch, Sitta nagaensis
- White-tailed nuthatch, Sitta himalayensis
- Przevalski's nuthatch, Sitta przewalskii (E)
- Snowy-browed nuthatch, Sitta villosa
- Yunnan nuthatch, Sitta yunnanensis (E)
- Velvet-fronted nuthatch, Sitta frontalis
- Yellow-billed nuthatch, Sitta solangiae
- Giant nuthatch, Sitta magna
- Beautiful nuthatch, Sitta formosa

== Treecreepers ==
Order: Passeriformes Family: Certhiidae

Treecreepers are small woodland birds, brown above and white below. They have thin pointed down-curved bills, which they use to extricate insects from bark. They have stiff tail feathers, like woodpeckers, which they use to support themselves on vertical trees.

- Eurasian treecreeper, Certhia familiaris
- Hodgson's treecreeper, Certhia hodgsoni
- Sichuan treecreeper, Certhia tianquanensis (E)
- Bar-tailed treecreeper, Certhia himalayana
- Rusty-flanked treecreeper, Certhia nipalensis
- Sikkim treecreeper, Certhia discolor
- Hume's treecreeper, Certhia manipurensis

== Wrens ==
Order: Passeriformes Family: Troglodytidae

The wrens are mainly small and inconspicuous except for their loud songs. These birds have short wings and thin down-turned bills. Several species often hold their tails upright. All are insectivorous.

- Eurasian wren, Troglodytes troglodytes

== Spotted elachura ==
Order: Passeriformes Family: Elachuridae

This species, the only one in its family, inhabits forest undergrowth throughout South East Asia.

- Spotted elachura, Elachura formosa

== Dippers ==
Order: Passeriformes Family: Cinclidae

Dippers are a group of perching birds whose habitat includes aquatic environments in the Americas, Europe and Asia. They are named for their bobbing or dipping movements.

- White-throated dipper, Cinclus cinclus
- Brown dipper, Cinclus pallasii

== Starlings ==
Order: Passeriformes Family: Sturnidae

Starlings are small to medium-sized passerine birds. Their flight is strong and direct and they are very gregarious. Their preferred habitat is fairly open country. They eat insects and fruit. Plumage is typically dark with a metallic sheen.

- Asian glossy starling, Aplonis panayensis (A)
- Golden-crested myna, Ampeliceps coronatus
- Common hill myna, Gracula religiosa
- European starling, Sturnus vulgaris
- Rosy starling, Pastor roseus
- Daurian starling, Agropsar sturninus
- Chestnut-cheeked starling, Agropsar philippensis
- Black-collared starling, Gracupica nigricollis
- Indian pied starling, Gracupica contra
- Siamese pied starling, Gracupica floweri
- White-shouldered starling, Sturnia sinensis
- Brahminy starling, Sturnia pagodarum (A)
- Chestnut-tailed starling, Sturnia malabarica
- Red-billed starling, Spodiopsar sericeus
- White-cheeked starling, Spodiopsar cineraceus
- Common myna, Acridotheres tristis
- Bank myna, Acridotheres ginginianus (A)
- Burmese myna, Acridotheres burmannicus
- Javan myna, Acridotheres javanicus (I)
- Collared myna, Acridotheres albocinctus
- Great myna, Acridotheres grandis
- Crested myna, Acridotheres cristatellus
- Spot-winged starling, Saroglossa spilopterus (A)

== Thrushes and allies ==
Order: Passeriformes Family: Turdidae

The thrushes are a group of passerine birds that occur mainly in the Old World. They are plump, soft plumaged, small to medium-sized insectivores or sometimes omnivores, often feeding on the ground. Many have attractive songs.

- Grandala, Grandala coelicolor
- Long-tailed thrush, Zoothera dixoni
- Alpine thrush, Zoothera mollissima
- Himalayan thrush, Zoothera salimalii
- Sichuan thrush, Zoothera griseiceps
- Dark-sided thrush, Zoothera marginata
- Long-billed thrush, Zoothera monticola (A)
- White's thrush, Zoothera aurea
- Scaly thrush, Zoothera dauma
- Purple cochoa, Cochoa purpurea
- Green cochoa, Cochoa viridis
- Siberian thrush, Geokichla sibirica
- Orange-headed thrush, Geokichla citrina
- Chinese thrush, Otocichla mupinensis
- Mistle thrush, Turdus viscivorus
- Song thrush, Turdus philomelos
- Redwing, Turdus iliacus
- Eurasian blackbird, Turdus merula
- Chinese blackbird, Turdus mandarinus
- Gray-winged blackbird, Turdus boulboul
- Japanese thrush, Turdus cardis
- Gray-backed thrush, Turdus hortulorum
- Tickell's thrush, Turdus unicolor
- Black-breasted thrush, Turdus dissimilis
- Gray-sided thrush, Turdus feae
- Eyebrowed thrush, Turdus obscurus
- Brown-headed thrush, Turdus chrysolaus
- Pale thrush, Turdus pallidus
- White-backed thrush, Turdus kessleri
- Tibetan blackbird, Turdus maximus
- Fieldfare, Turdus pilaris
- White-collared blackbird, Turdus albocinctus
- Chestnut thrush, Turdus rubrocanus
- Black-throated thrush, Turdus atrogularis
- Red-throated thrush, Turdus ruficollis
- Dusky thrush, Turdus eunomus
- Naumann's thrush, Turdus naumanni

== Old World flycatchers ==
Order: Passeriformes Family: Muscicapidae

Old World flycatchers are a large group of small passerine birds native to the Old World. They are mainly small arboreal insectivores. The appearance of these birds is highly varied, but they mostly have weak songs and harsh calls.

- Gray-streaked flycatcher, Muscicapa griseisticta
- Dark-sided flycatcher, Muscicapa sibirica
- Ferruginous flycatcher, Muscicapa ferruginea
- Asian brown flycatcher, Muscicapa dauurica
- Brown-breasted flycatcher, Muscicapa muttui
- Spotted flycatcher, Muscicapa striata
- Rufous-tailed scrub-robin, Cercotrichas galactotes
- Oriental magpie-robin, Copsychus saularis
- White-rumped shama, Copsychus malabaricus
- White-gorgeted flycatcher, Anthipes monileger
- White-tailed flycatcher, Cyornis concretus
- Hainan blue flycatcher, Cyornis hainanus
- Pale-chinned blue flycatcher, Cyornis poliogenys
- Pale blue flycatcher, Cyornis unicolor
- Blue-throated flycatcher, Cyornis rubeculoides
- Chinese blue flycatcher, Cyornis glaucicomans
- Hill blue flycatcher, Cyornis whitei
- Tickell's blue flycatcher, Cyornis tickelliae
- Brown-chested jungle-flycatcher, Cyornis brunneatus
- Large niltava, Niltava grandis
- Small niltava, Niltava macgrigoriae
- Fujian niltava, Niltava davidi
- Rufous-bellied niltava, Niltava sundara
- Chinese vivid niltava, Niltava oatesi (E)
- Blue-and-white flycatcher, Cyanoptila cyanomelana
- Zappey's flycatcher, Cyanoptila cumatilis
- Verditer flycatcher, Eumyias thalassina
- European robin, Erithacus rubecula
- Rusty-bellied shortwing, Brachypteryx hyperythra
- Gould's shortwing, Brachypteryx stellata
- Lesser shortwing, Brachypteryx leucophrys
- Himalayan shortwing, Brachypteryx cruralis
- Chinese shortwing, Brachypteryx sinensis (E)
- Rufous-tailed robin, Larvivora sibilans
- Rufous-headed robin, Larvivora ruficeps
- Japanese robin, Larvivora akahige
- Ryukyu robin, Larvivora komadori
- Indian blue robin, Larvivora brunnea
- Siberian blue robin, Larvivora cyane
- Common nightingale, Luscinia megarhynchos
- White-bellied redstart, Luscinia phoenicuroides
- Bluethroat, Luscinia svecica
- Blue whistling-thrush, Myophonus caeruleus
- Little forktail, Enicurus scouleri
- White-crowned forktail, Enicurus leschenaulti
- Spotted forktail, Enicurus maculatus
- Black-backed forktail, Enicurus immaculatus
- Slaty-backed forktail, Enicurus schistaceus
- Firethroat, Calliope pectardens
- Blackthroat, Calliope obscura
- Siberian rubythroat, Calliope calliope
- Himalayan rubythroat, Calliope pectoralis
- Chinese rubythroat, Calliope tschebaiewi
- White-tailed robin, Myiomela leucura
- Blue-fronted robin, Cinclidium frontale
- Red-flanked bluetail, Tarsiger cyanurus
- Himalayan bluetail, Tarsiger rufilatus
- Rufous-breasted bush-robin, Tarsiger hyperythrus
- White-browed bush-robin, Tarsiger indicus
- Golden bush-robin, Tarsiger chrysaeus
- Yellow-rumped flycatcher, Ficedula zanthopygia
- Green-backed flycatcher, Ficedula elisae
- Narcissus flycatcher, Ficedula narcissina
- Ryukyu flycatcher, Ficedula owstoni
- Mugimaki flycatcher, Ficedula mugimaki
- Slaty-backed flycatcher, Ficedula hodgsonii
- Slaty-blue flycatcher, Ficedula tricolor
- Snowy-browed flycatcher, Ficedula hyperythra
- Pygmy flycatcher, Ficedula hodgsoni
- Rufous-gorgeted flycatcher, Ficedula strophiata
- Sapphire flycatcher, Ficedula sapphira
- Little pied flycatcher, Ficedula westermanni
- Ultramarine flycatcher, Ficedula superciliaris
- Taiga flycatcher, Ficedula albicilla
- Red-breasted flycatcher, Ficedula parva (A)
- European pied flycatcher, Ficedula hypoleuca (A)
- Blue-fronted redstart, Phoenicurus frontalis
- Plumbeous redstart, Phoenicurus fuliginosus
- Rufous-backed redstart, Phoenicurus erythronota
- White-capped redstart, Phoenicurus leucocephalus
- Ala Shan redstart, Phoenicurus alaschanicus (E)
- Blue-capped redstart, Phoenicurus caeruleocephalus
- Common redstart, Phoenicurus phoenicurus
- Hodgson's redstart, Phoenicurus hodgsoni
- White-throated redstart, Phoenicurus schisticeps
- White-winged redstart, Phoenicurus erythrogaster
- Black redstart, Phoenicurus ochruros
- Daurian redstart, Phoenicurus auroreus
- Chestnut-bellied rock-thrush, Monticola rufiventris
- White-throated rock-thrush, Monticola gularis
- Rufous-tailed rock-thrush, Monticola saxatilis
- Blue rock-thrush, Monticola solitarius
- White-throated bushchat, Saxicola insignis
- Siberian stonechat, Saxicola maurus
- Amur stonechat, Saxicola stejnegeri
- Pied bushchat, Saxicola caprata
- Jerdon's bushchat, Saxicola jerdoni
- Gray bushchat, Saxicola ferreus
- Northern wheatear, Oenanthe oenanthe
- Isabelline wheatear, Oenanthe isabellina
- Desert wheatear, Oenanthe deserti
- Eastern black-eared wheatear, Oenanthe melanoleuca (A)
- Pied wheatear, Oenanthe pleschanka
- Variable wheatear, Oenanthe picata

== Waxwings ==
Order: Passeriformes Family: Bombycillidae

The waxwings are a group of birds with soft silky plumage and unique red tips to some of the wing feathers. In the Bohemian and cedar waxwings, these tips look like sealing wax and give the group its name. These are arboreal birds of northern forests. They live on insects in summer and berries in winter.

- Bohemian waxwing, Bombycilla garrulus
- Japanese waxwing, Bombycilla japonica

== Flowerpeckers ==
Order: Passeriformes Family: Dicaeidae

The flowerpeckers are very small, stout, often brightly colored birds, with short tails, short thick curved bills and tubular tongues.

- Thick-billed flowerpecker, Dicaeum agile
- Yellow-vented flowerpecker, Dicaeum chrysorrheum
- Yellow-bellied flowerpecker, Dicaeum melanozanthum
- Plain flowerpecker, Dicaeum minullum
- Fire-breasted flowerpecker, Dicaeum ignipectus
- Scarlet-backed flowerpecker, Dicaeum cruentatum

== Sunbirds and spiderhunters ==
Order: Passeriformes Family: Nectariniidae

The sunbirds and spiderhunters are very small passerine birds which feed largely on nectar, although they will also take insects, especially when feeding young. Flight is fast and direct on their short wings. Most species can take nectar by hovering like a hummingbird, but usually perch to feed.

- Ruby-cheeked sunbird, Chalcoparia singalensis
- Brown-throated sunbird, Anthreptes malacensis (A)
- Purple sunbird, Cinnyris asiaticus
- Olive-backed sunbird, Cinnyris jugularis
- Fire-tailed sunbird, Aethopyga ignicauda
- Black-throated sunbird, Aethopyga saturata
- Mrs. Gould's sunbird, Aethopyga gouldiae
- Green-tailed sunbird, Aethopyga nipalensis
- Crimson sunbird, Aethopyga siparaja
- Fork-tailed sunbird, Aethopyga christinae
- Purple-naped sunbird, Hypogramma hypogrammicum
- Little spiderhunter, Arachnothera longirostra
- Streaked spiderhunter, Arachnothera magna

== Fairy-bluebirds ==
Order: Passeriformes Family: Irenidae

The fairy-bluebirds are bulbul-like birds of open forest or thorn scrub. The males are dark-blue and the females a duller green.

- Asian fairy-bluebird, Irena puella

== Leafbirds ==
Order: Passeriformes Family: Chloropseidae

The leafbirds are small, bulbul-like birds. The males are brightly plumaged, usually in greens and yellows.

- Blue-winged leafbird, Chloropsis cochinchinensis
- Golden-fronted leafbird, Chloropsis aurifrons
- Orange-bellied leafbird, Chloropsis hardwickii

== Pinktails ==
Order: Passeriformes Family: Urocynchramidae

Przevalski's pinktail is an unusual passerine bird endemic to the mountains of central-west China.

- Przevalski's pinktail, Urocynchramus pylzowi (E)

== Weavers and allies ==
Order: Passeriformes Family: Ploceidae

The weavers are small passerine birds related to the finches. They are seed-eating birds with rounded conical bills. The males of many species are brightly colored, usually in red or yellow and black, some species show variation in color only in the breeding season.

- Streaked weaver, Ploceus manyar
- Baya weaver, Ploceus philippinus

== Waxbills and allies ==
Order: Passeriformes Family: Estrildidae

The estrildid finches are small passerine birds of the Old World tropics and Australasia. They are gregarious and often colonial seed eaters with short thick but pointed bills. They are all similar in structure and habits, but have a wide variation in plumage colors and patterns.

- Java sparrow, Padda oryzivora (I)
- Scaly-breasted munia, Lonchura punctulata
- White-rumped munia, Lonchura striata
- Chestnut munia, Lonchura atricapilla
- Pin-tailed parrotfinch, Erythrura prasina (A)
- Red avadavat, Amandava amandava

== Accentors ==
Order: Passeriformes Family: Prunellidae

The accentors are in the only bird family, Prunellidae, which is completely endemic to the Palearctic. They are small, fairly drab species superficially similar to sparrows.

- Alpine accentor, Prunella collaris
- Altai accentor, Prunella himalayana
- Robin accentor, Prunella rubeculoides
- Rufous-breasted accentor, Prunella strophiata
- Siberian accentor, Prunella montanella
- Brown accentor, Prunella fulvescens
- Black-throated accentor, Prunella atrogularis
- Mongolian accentor, Prunella koslowi
- Maroon-backed accentor, Prunella immaculata

== Old World sparrows ==
Order: Passeriformes Family: Passeridae

Old World sparrows are small passerine birds. In general, sparrows tend to be small, plump, brown or gray birds with short tails and short powerful beaks. Sparrows are seed eaters, but they also consume small insects.

- Saxaul sparrow, Passer ammodendri
- House sparrow, Passer domesticus
- Spanish sparrow, Passer hispaniolensis
- Russet sparrow, Passer cinnamomeus
- Eurasian tree sparrow, Passer montanus
- Rock sparrow, Petronia petronia
- White-winged snowfinch, Montifringilla nivalis
- Tibetan snowfinch, Montifringilla henrici
- Black-winged snowfinch, Montifringilla adamsi
- White-rumped snowfinch, Montifringilla taczanowskii
- Pere David's snowfinch, Montifringilla davidiana
- Rufous-necked snowfinch, Montifringilla ruficollis
- Blanford's snowfinch, Montifringilla blanfordi

== Wagtails and pipits ==
Order: Passeriformes Family: Motacillidae

Motacillidae is a family of small passerine birds with medium to long tails. They include the wagtails, longclaws and pipits. They are slender, ground feeding insectivores of open country.

- Forest wagtail, Dendronanthus indicus
- Gray wagtail, Motacilla cinerea
- Western yellow wagtail, Motacilla flava
- Eastern yellow wagtail, Motacilla tschutschensis
- Citrine wagtail, Motacilla citreola
- White-browed wagtail, Motacilla maderaspatensis (A)
- Japanese wagtail, Motacilla grandis (A)
- White wagtail, Motacilla alba
- Richard's pipit, Anthus richardi
- Paddyfield pipit, Anthus rufulus
- Blyth's pipit, Anthus godlewskii
- Tawny pipit, Anthus campestris
- Upland pipit, Anthus sylvanus
- Meadow pipit, Anthus pratensis
- Rosy pipit, Anthus roseatus
- Tree pipit, Anthus trivialis
- Olive-backed pipit, Anthus hodgsoni
- Pechora pipit, Anthus gustavi
- Red-throated pipit, Anthus cervinus
- Water pipit, Anthus spinoletta
- Siberian pipit, Anthus japonicus

== Finches, euphonias, and allies ==
Order: Passeriformes Family: Fringillidae

Finches are seed-eating passerine birds, that are small to moderately large and have a strong beak, usually conical and in some species very large. All have twelve tail feathers and nine primaries. These birds have a bouncing flight with alternating bouts of flapping and gliding on closed wings, and most sing well. China has the greatest diversity of finches of any country.

- Common chaffinch, Fringilla coelebs
- Brambling, Fringilla montifringilla
- Collared grosbeak, Mycerobas affinis
- Spot-winged grosbeak, Mycerobas melanozanthos
- White-winged grosbeak, Mycerobas carnipes
- Hawfinch, Coccothraustes coccothraustes
- Yellow-billed grosbeak, Eophona migratoria
- Japanese grosbeak, Eophona personata
- Common rosefinch, Carpodacus erythrinus
- Scarlet finch, Carpodacus sipahi
- Red-mantled rosefinch, Carpodacus rhodochlamys
- Blyth's rosefinch, Carpodacus grandis
- Himalayan beautiful rosefinch, Carpodacus pulcherrimus
- Chinese beautiful rosefinch, Carpodacus davidianus
- Pink-rumped rosefinch, Carpodacus waltoni
- Dark-rumped rosefinch, Carpodacus edwardsii
- Pink-browed rosefinch, Carpodacus rhodochrous
- Spot-winged rosefinch, Carpodacus rhodopeplus
- Sharpe's rosefinch, Carpodacus verreauxii
- Vinaceous rosefinch, Carpodacus vinaceus
- Pale rosefinch, Carpodacus stoliczkae
- Tibetan rosefinch, Carpodacus roborowskii (E)
- Sillem's rosefinch, Carpodacus sillemi (E)
- Streaked rosefinch, Carpodacus rubicilloides
- Great rosefinch, Carpodacus rubicilla
- Long-tailed rosefinch, Carpodacus sibiricus
- Red-fronted rosefinch, Carpodacus puniceus
- Crimson-browed finch, Carpodacus subhimachalus
- Pallas's rosefinch, Carpodacus roseus
- Three-banded rosefinch, Carpodacus trifasciatus
- Himalayan white-browed rosefinch, Carpodacus thura
- Chinese white-browed rosefinch, Carpodacus dubius
- Pine grosbeak, Pinicola enucleator
- Brown bullfinch, Pyrrhula nipalensis
- Red-headed bullfinch, Pyrrhula erythrocephala
- Gray-headed bullfinch, Pyrrhula erythaca
- Eurasian bullfinch, Pyrrhula pyrrhula
- Crimson-winged finch, Rhodopechys sanguineus
- Mongolian finch, Bucanetes mongolicus
- Blanford's rosefinch, Agraphospiza rubescens
- Gold-naped finch, Pyrrhoplectes epauletta
- Dark-breasted rosefinch, Procarduelis nipalensis
- Plain mountain finch, Leucosticte nemoricola
- Black-headed mountain finch, Leucosticte brandti
- Asian rosy-finch, Leucosticte arctoa
- Desert finch, Rhodospiza obsoleta
- European greenfinch, Chloris chloris
- Oriental greenfinch, Chloris sinica
- Yellow-breasted greenfinch, Chloris spinoides
- Black-headed greenfinch, Chloris ambigua
- Twite, Linaria flavirostris
- Eurasian linnet, Linaria cannabina
- Common redpoll, Acanthis flammea
- Hoary redpoll, Acanthis hornemanni
- Red crossbill, Loxia curvirostra
- White-winged crossbill, Loxia leucoptera
- European goldfinch, Carduelis carduelis
- Fire-fronted serin, Serinus pusillus
- Tibetan serin, Spinus thibetanus
- Eurasian siskin, Spinus spinus

== Longspurs and snow buntings ==
Order: Passeriformes Family: Calcariidae

The Calcariidae are a group of passerine birds which had been traditionally grouped with the New World sparrows, but differ in a number of respects and are usually found in open grassy areas.

- Lapland longspur, Calcarius lapponicus
- Snow bunting, Plectrophenax nivalis

== Old World buntings ==
Order: Passeriformes Family: Emberizidae

The emberizids are a large family of passerine birds. They are seed-eating birds with distinctively shaped bills. Many emberizid species have distinctive head patterns.

- Crested bunting, Emberiza lathami
- Black-headed bunting, Emberiza melanocephala (A)
- Red-headed bunting, Emberiza bruniceps
- Corn bunting, Emberiza calandra
- Chestnut-eared bunting, Emberiza fucata
- Tibetan bunting, Emberiza koslowi (E)
- Rufous-backed bunting, Emberiza jankowskii
- Rock bunting, Emberiza cia
- Godlewski's bunting, Emberiza godlewskii
- Meadow bunting, Emberiza cioides
- White-capped bunting, Emberiza stewarti (A)
- Yellowhammer, Emberiza citrinella
- Pine bunting, Emberiza leucocephalos
- Gray-necked bunting, Emberiza buchanani
- Ortolan bunting, Emberiza hortulana
- Slaty bunting, Emberiza siemsseni (E)
- Yellow-throated bunting, Emberiza elegans
- Ochre-rumped bunting, Emberiza yessoensis
- Pallas's bunting, Emberiza pallasi
- Reed bunting, Emberiza schoeniclus
- Yellow-breasted bunting, Emberiza aureola
- Little bunting, Emberiza pusilla
- Rustic bunting, Emberiza rustica
- Yellow bunting, Emberiza sulphurata
- Black-faced bunting, Emberiza spodocephala
- Chestnut bunting, Emberiza rutila
- Yellow-browed bunting, Emberiza chrysophrys
- Tristram's bunting, Emberiza tristrami
- Gray bunting, Emberiza variabilis (A)

== New World sparrows ==
Order: Passeriformes Family: Passerellidae

Until 2017, these species were considered part of the family Emberizidae. Most of the species are known as sparrows, but these birds are not closely related to the Old World sparrows which are in the family Passeridae. Many of these have distinctive head patterns.

- White-crowned sparrow, Zonotrichia leucophrys (A)

== See also ==
- List of birds
- Lists of birds by region
- List of endangered and protected species of China
