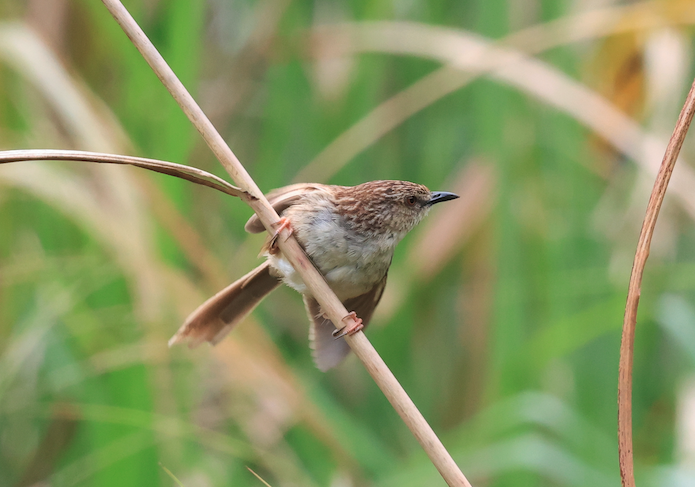

Scientific classification
- Kingdom: Animalia
- Phylum: Chordata
- Class: Aves
- Order: Passeriformes
- Family: Cisticolidae
- Genus: Prinia
- Species: P. striata

Binomial name
- Prinia striata Swinhoe, 1859

= Striped prinia =

Species of bird

The striped prinia (Prinia striata) or Swinhoe's prinia is a species of bird in the family Cisticolidae. It was formerly lumped with the Himalayan prinia (P. crinigera) as the striated prinia, but was split from it following a study published in 2019.

It is distributed throughout mainland China and Taiwan. It is sympatric with P. crinigera in the Yunnan Province of China.

There are three known subspecies: P. s. catharia which ranges from northeast India through Myanmar to south-central China. P. s. parumstriata, which is distributed throughout southeast and central China, and P. s. striata, which is restricted to Taiwan.
