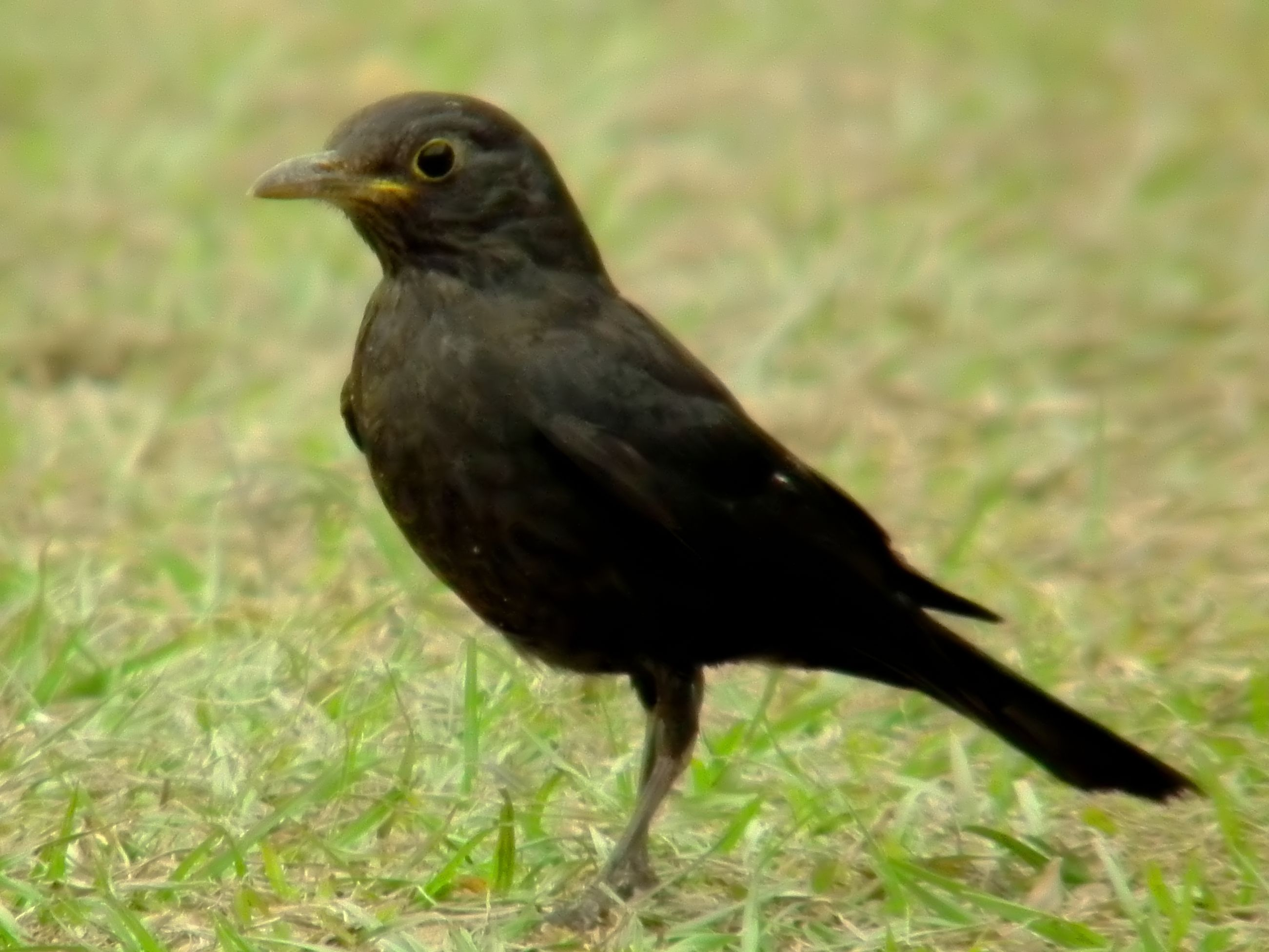

Conservation status
- Least Concern (IUCN 3.1)

Scientific classification
- Kingdom: Animalia
- Phylum: Chordata
- Class: Aves
- Order: Passeriformes
- Family: Turdidae
- Genus: Turdus
- Species: T. mandarinus

Binomial name
- Turdus mandarinus Bonaparte, 1850

Synonyms
- Turdus maximus mandarinus

= Chinese blackbird =

Species of bird

The Chinese blackbird (Turdus mandarinus) is a member of the thrush family Turdidae. It was formerly considered conspecific with the related common blackbird (T. merula).

== Subspecies ==
- The Chinese blackbird (T. m. mandarinus) breeds throughout much of southern, central and eastern China. It is a partial migrant to Hong Kong and south to Laos and Vietnam. The male is sooty black, and the female is similar but browner, and paler on the underparts. It is a large subspecies.
- Sowerby's blackbird (T. m. sowerbyi), named for James Sowerby, British naturalist and illustrator, breeds from eastern Sichuan to Guizhou. It is partially migratory, with some individuals spending the winter in southern China and northern Indochina. It resembles mandarinus, but is smaller and darker below.

== Social Behavior ==
It is typically monogamous, but some exceptions have been observed.

== Diet ==
It is omnivorous. During the breeding season, it primarily feeds on earthworms.
