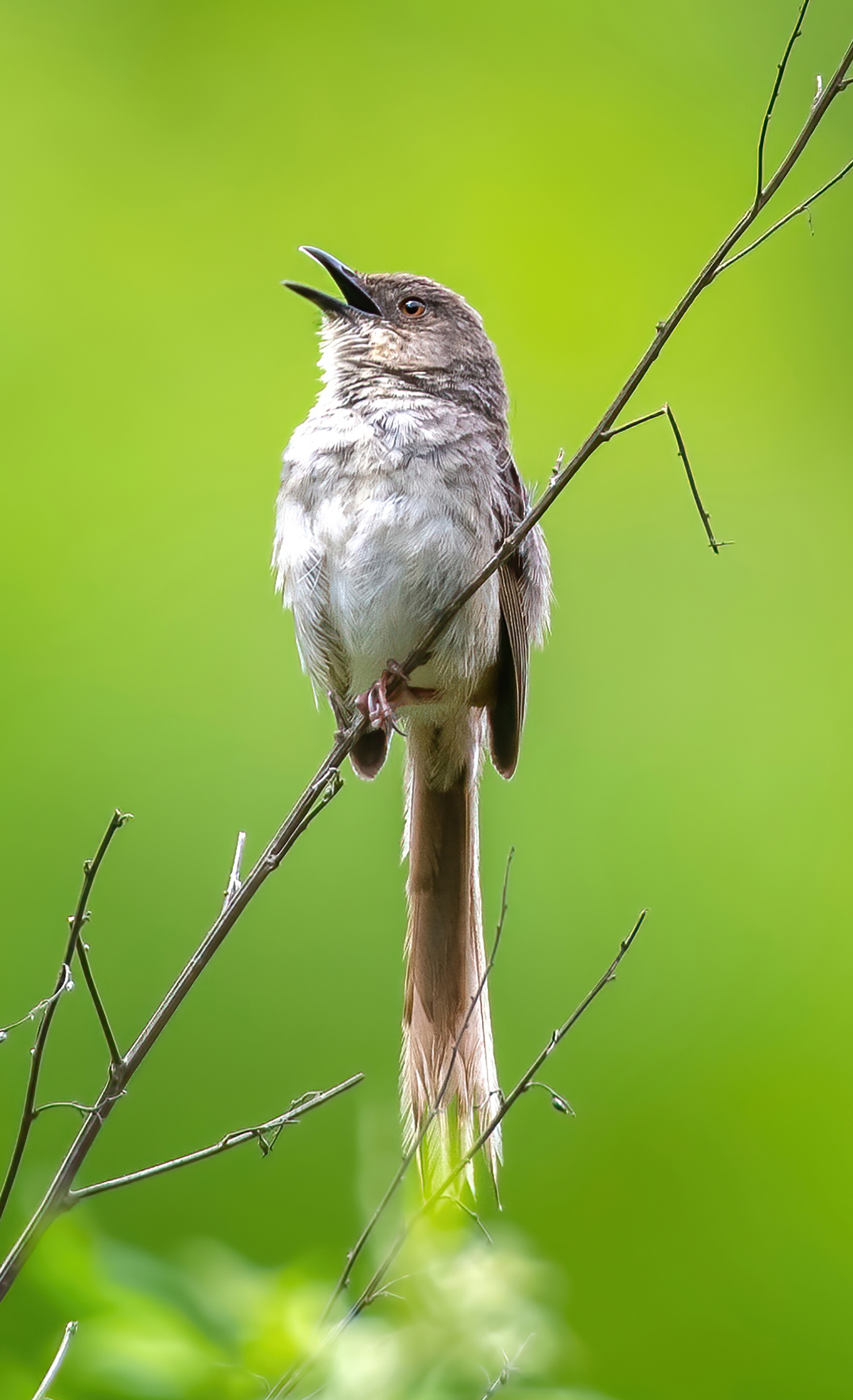
- P. c. crinigera in Shivapuri Nagarjun National Park, Nepal

Conservation status
- Least Concern (IUCN 3.1)

Scientific classification
- Kingdom: Animalia
- Phylum: Chordata
- Class: Aves
- Order: Passeriformes
- Family: Cisticolidae
- Genus: Prinia
- Species: P. crinigera

Binomial name
- Prinia crinigera (Hodgson, 1836)

= Himalayan prinia =

Species of bird

The Himalayan prinia (Prinia crinigera) is a species of bird in the family Cisticolidae. It was formerly lumped in with the striped prinia (P. striata) as the striated prinia.

It is found in the Indian subcontinent and parts of China, with its range generally following the Himalayas. It is distributed in the countries of Afghanistan, Pakistan, India, Bhutan, Nepal, and the Yunnan Province in China. Populations in Myanmar, most of China, and Taiwan are now considered to belong to P. striata following a 2019 study. Both P. crinigera and P. striata are sympatric in the Yunnan Province.

There are four known subspecies: P. c. striatula, which is known from the mountains of Afghanistan and west Pakistan (the palest subspecies); P. c. crinigera, which is distributed from north Pakistan to Arunachal Pradesh in northeast India; P. c. yunnanensis, which is restricted to the northwestern Yunnan Province in China, and P. c. bangsi in the southeastern Yunnan Province. P. c. bangsi was formerly considered a subspecies of Deignan's prinia (formerly the brown prinia) until the 2019 study.

== Description ==
Its tail is long and broad, with a cold-toned dark color.

It exhibits significant sexual dimorphism in both size and color. Appearance varies by season. During the non-breeding season, both sexes have streaking on the upper parts and mottling on the sides of the face and breast.

During the breeding season, males have a blackish crown, which is paler around the edges in many individuals. The face is blackish, and the sides of the breast are dark and mottled. The mantle is streaked, but not as distinctly as the crown. The bill is blackish.

Breeding females are lighter in color and have less streaking. The bill is pale pinkish, darker from the tip to the lower mandible.
