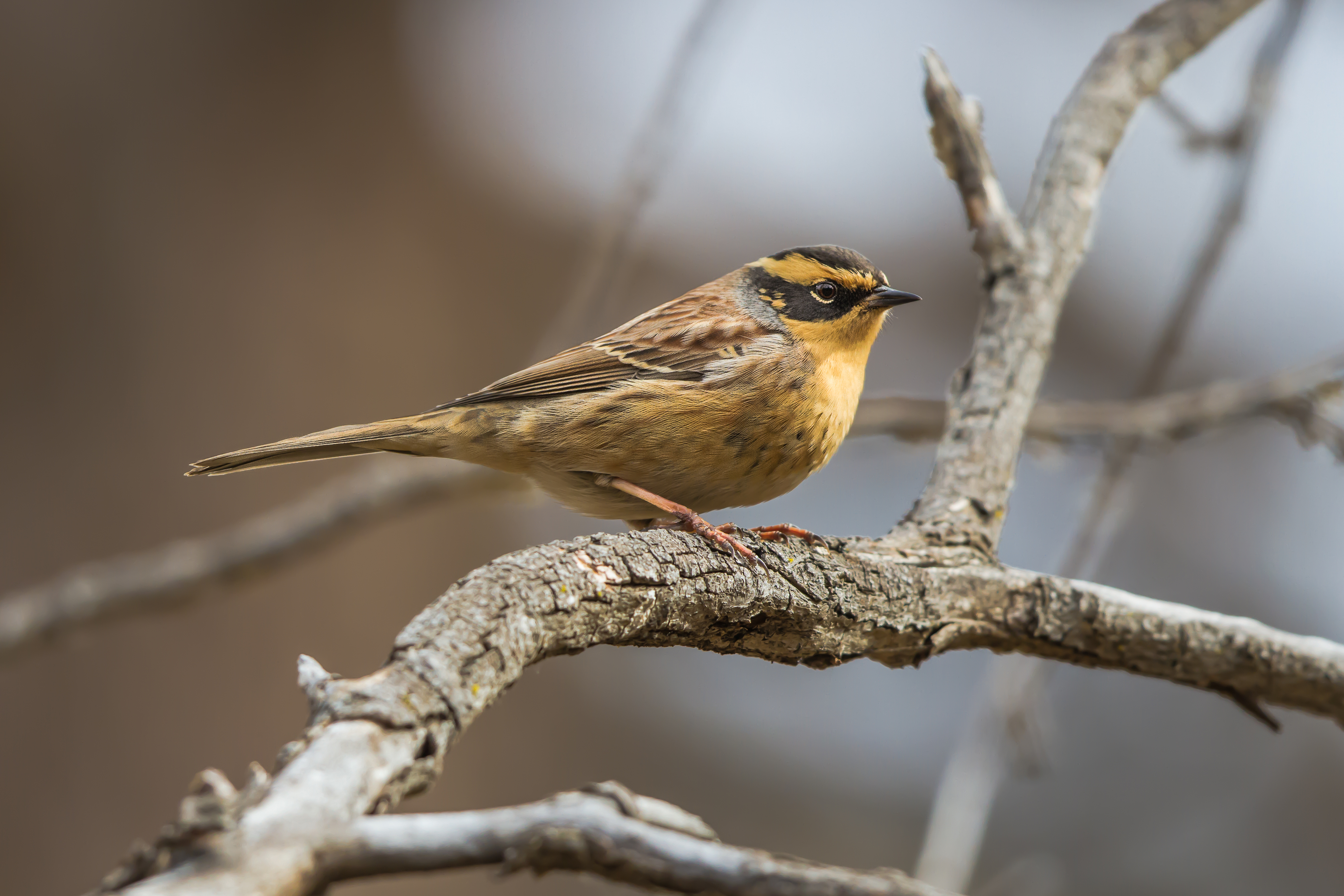

Conservation status
- Least Concern (IUCN 3.1)

Scientific classification
- Kingdom: Animalia
- Phylum: Chordata
- Class: Aves
- Order: Passeriformes
- Family: Prunellidae
- Genus: Prunella
- Species: P. montanella

Binomial name
- Prunella montanella (Pallas, 1776)
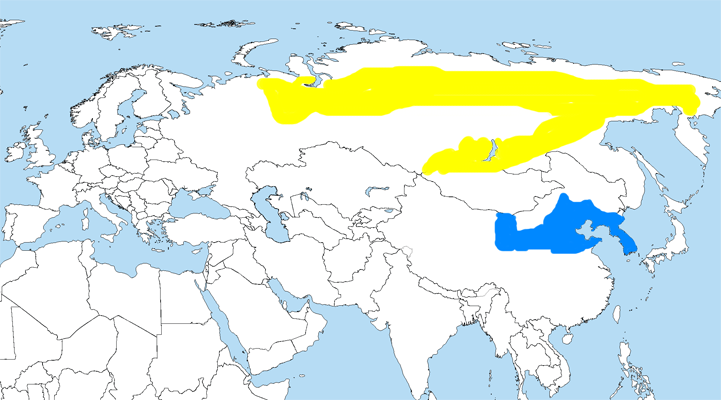
- Breeding summer visitor Winter visitor (ranges are very approximate)

= Siberian accentor =

Small passerine bird that breeds in northern Russia

The Siberian accentor (Prunella montanella) is a small passerine bird that breeds in northern Russia from the Ural Mountains eastwards across Siberia. It is migratory, wintering in Korea and eastern China, with rare occurrences in western Europe and northwestern North America. Its typical breeding habitat is subarctic deciduous forests and open coniferous woodland, often close to water, although it also occurs in mountains and spruce taiga. It inhabits bushes and shrubs in winter, frequently near streams, but may also be found in dry grassland and woods.

The Siberian accentor has brown upperparts and wings, with bright chestnut streaking on its back and a greyish-brown rump and tail. The head has a dark brown crown and a long, wide pale yellow supercilium ("eyebrow"). All plumages are quite similar. The nest is an open cup in dense shrub or a tree into which the female lays four to six glossy deep blue-green eggs that hatch in about ten days. Adults and chicks feed mainly on insects, typically picked off the ground, but sometimes taken from vegetation. In winter, the accentors may also consume seeds or feed near human habitation.

Breeding over a huge area, the Siberian accentor has a large and stable population. It is therefore evaluated as a species of least concern by the International Union for Conservation of Nature (IUCN), although, as a northern breeding species, it may be affected by climate change in the long term. October and November 2016 saw an unprecedented influx of this species into western Europe, reaching as far as the United Kingdom.

== Taxonomy ==
The accentors are a family of small ground-living insectivorous birds, most of which are found in mountainous habitats in Eurasia, although the dunnock is a lowland species. Their relationships with other bird families are uncertain. All accentors are placed in a single genus, Prunella, but within that genus, the Siberian accentor is most similar in appearance to the black-throated, brown, Kozlov's, Radde's and Arabian accentors. These are of comparable size and typically have a pale supercilium and dark markings on the head or throat. However, a 2013 phylogenetic study indicates that the closest relative of the Siberian accentor is actually the physically dissimilar Japanese accentor.

On his return from his pioneering expedition to central and eastern Russia in 1768–1774, the Russia-based German zoologist Peter Simon Pallas formally described the Siberian accentor in 1776 as Motacilla montanella. The accentors were moved to their current genus by French ornithologist Louis Pierre Vieillot in 1816.

The Siberian accentor has two subspecies:

- Prunella montanella montanella, (Pallas, 1776), (Note: The parentheses show that the current genus name differs from that given originally) the nominate subspecies, breeds in northern Russia from just inside Europe eastwards to the Lena River. It also occurs further south, from the Ob to the Amur.
- Prunella montanella badia, Portenko, 1929, breeds in northeastern Siberia eastwards from the Lena, and south to the Sea of Okhotsk.

"Accentor" comes from the old scientific name for the Alpine accentor, Accentor collaris. It derives from Late Latin and means "sing with another" (ad + cantor). The genus name Prunella is from the German Braunelle, "dunnock", a diminutive of braun, "brown", and the specific montanella is a diminutive of Latin montanus, "mountain".

== Description ==
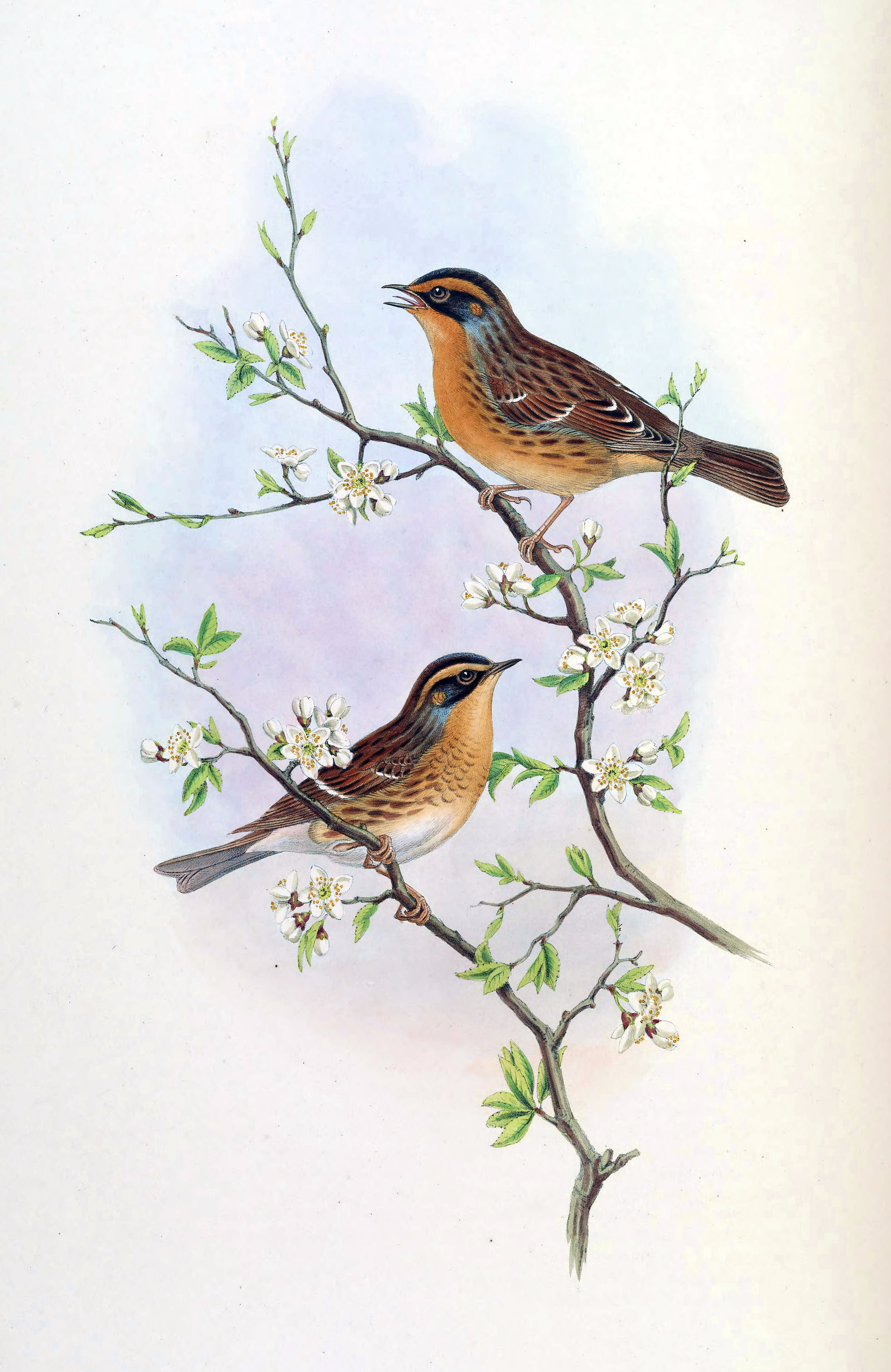
From John Gould's Birds of Asia, 1850–1883

The Siberian accentor is on average 14.5 centimetres (5.7 in) long and weighs 17.5 grams (0.62 oz). The adult of the nominate race has brown upperparts and wings, with bright chestnut streaking on its back and a greyish-brown rump and tail. There are two narrow whitish bars on the folded wings. The head has a dark brown crown, a long, wide pale yellow supercilium, a blackish patch behind the eye and grey sides to the neck. The underparts are ochre yellow, becoming strongly buff on the flanks and greyish on the lower belly. There are rich chestnut streaks on the sides of the breast and the flanks. The iris is a warm red-brown, the sharply pointed bill is dark and the legs are reddish.

All plumages are similar. The female has slightly duller underparts with weaker streaking, and the juvenile is overall duller with brown spots on the breast and chest. Juvenile birds in autumn also show more wear to the tail feathers and the tertials that cover the folded wing, and they often have a duller iris colour than the adults. The subspecies P. m. badia is somewhat smaller and darker than the nominate form, with richer brown upperparts, deeper buff underparts, and rustier flank streaks.

Adults undergo a complete moult between July and September after breeding has finished. Juvenile birds have a partial moult in the same period, replacing the head, body and some wing covert feathers.

The only species that can potentially be confused with the Siberian accentor is the related black-throated accentor, since first-autumn birds of the latter species may have a relatively inconspicuous dark throat. The Siberian accentor is still distinguishable by its rustier back colour, yellow (not off-white) supercilium and the absence of a white line below the black face mask.

=== Voice ===
The call of the Siberian accentor is a trisyllabic ti-ti-ti. The male's song, given from the top of a bush or tree, is a loud, high chirichiriri, variously described as similar to that of the Japanese accentor, the dunnock or the black-throated accentor. Breeding birds sing most vigorously early in the season, particularly at dawn, and some individuals may also sing on migration.

== Distribution and habitat ==
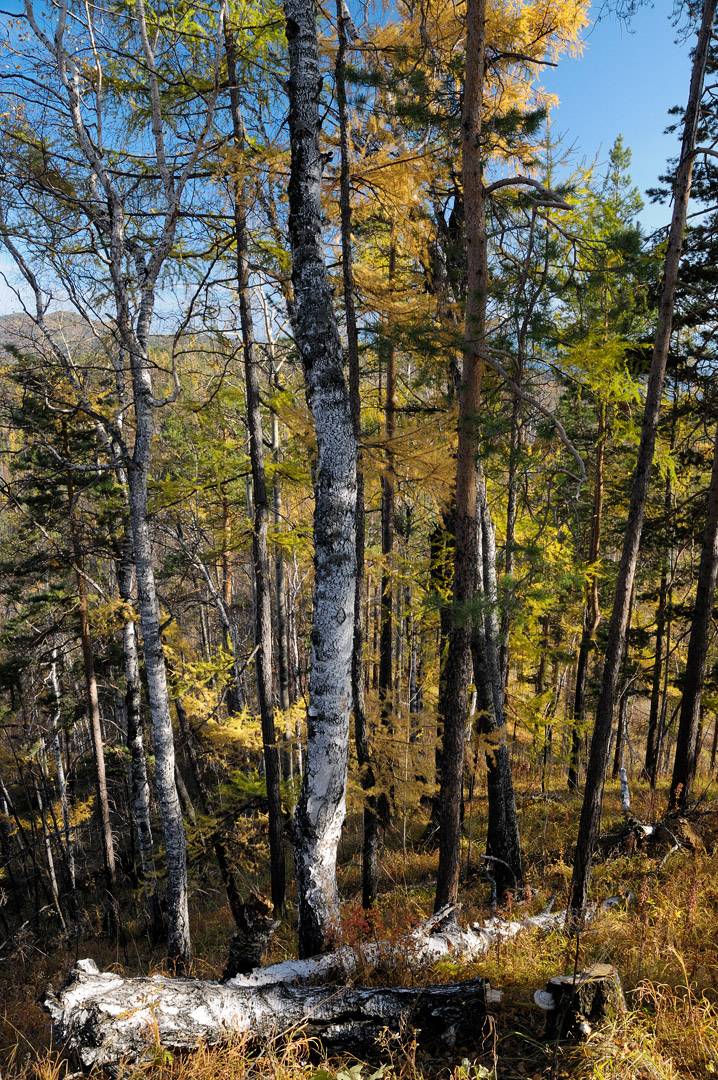
Subarctic woodlands near Lake Baikal

The Siberian accentor breeds in a belt across northern Russia east from just west of the Ural Mountains to the Pacific coast, with a second, more fragmented, band across southern Siberia. It is migratory, wintering in east China and Korea. This species winters in small numbers in Mongolia, but only rarely in Japan.

The breeding habitat is subarctic willow and birch forests, and open coniferous woodland, often close to rivers or bogs, although pairs are also found in mountains and spruce taiga. In winter, the Siberian accentor occupies bushes and shrubs, often near streams, but may also be found in dry grassland and woods.

=== Movements ===
Siberian accentors leave the north of their breeding range from mid-September onwards but may stay for a further month or two in the south. In spring, returning birds pass through Mongolia from the end of March and southeasternmost Russia in April and May, reaching their breeding grounds in May, perhaps as late as June in the far north.

Vagrant birds have been recorded in Belarus, Kazakhstan, Lebanon and several European countries, as well as in North America. Most North American records have been in western Alaska and British Columbia, but as of February 2018 there had been records of single birds away from the Pacific coast in Alberta, Idaho and Montana.

Alaskan records, like those in western Europe, are mainly from late September to November; occurrences in Canada are less predictable, although mostly in autumn and winter, and mostly at bird feeders.

==== October–November 2016 influx ====
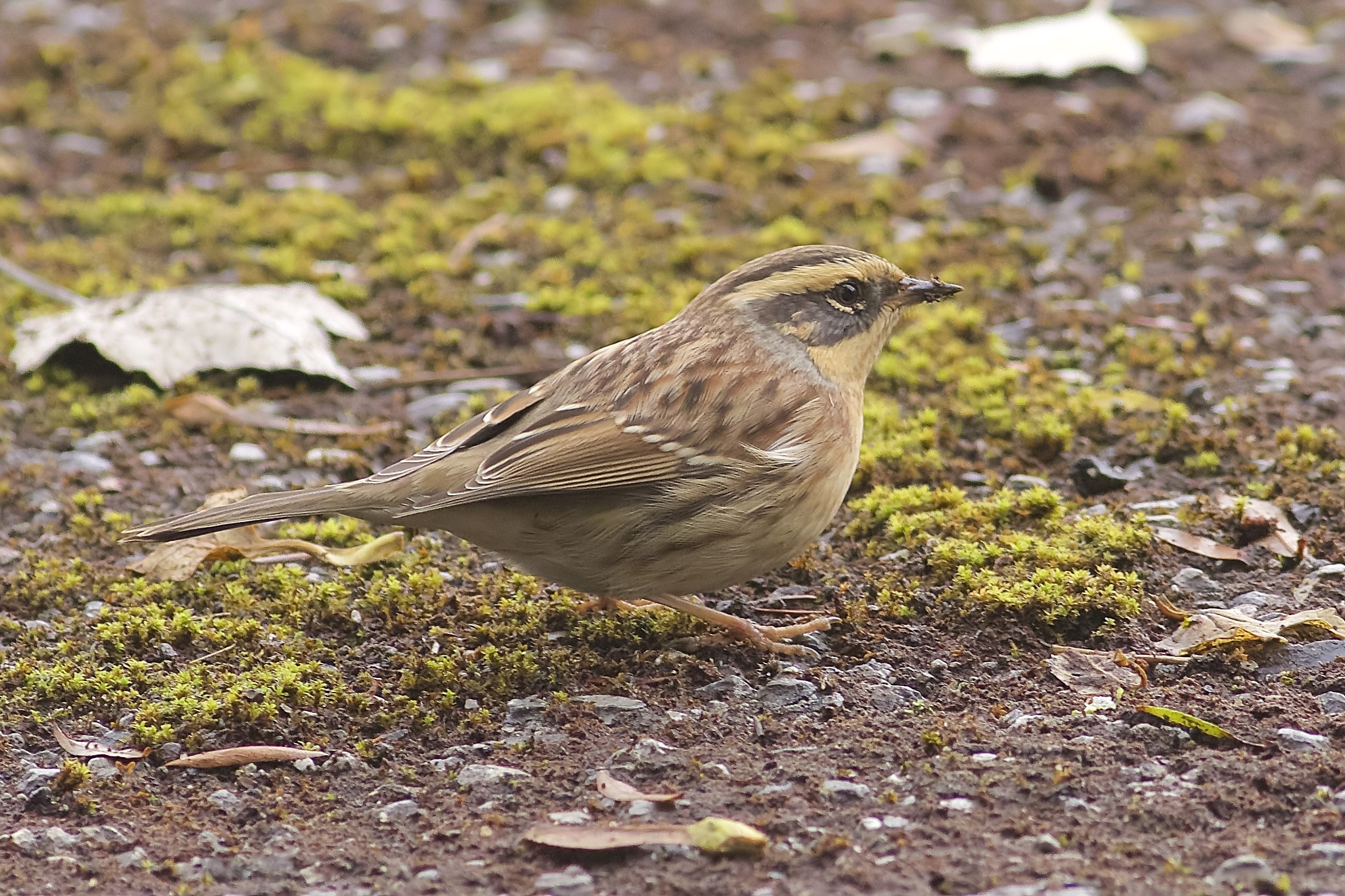
A bird from the October 2016 influx at Easington, East Riding of Yorkshire

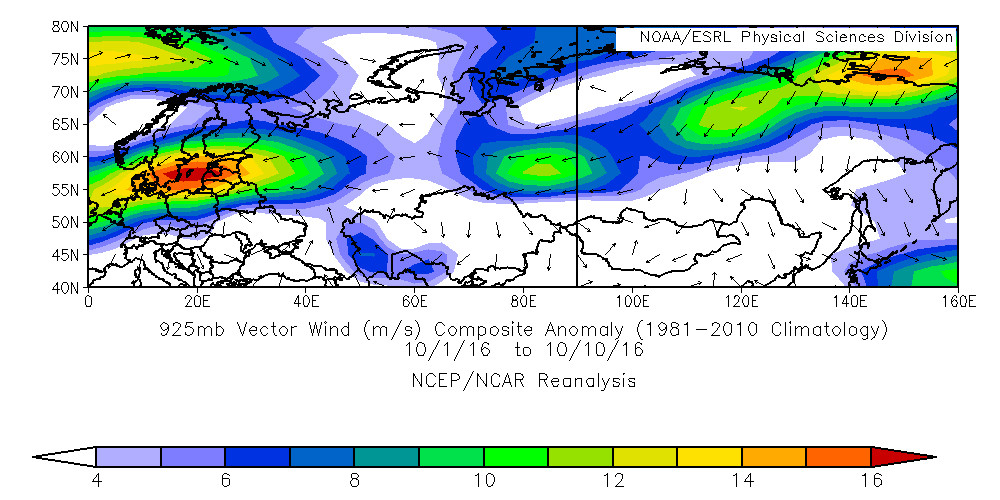
Wind map for Eurasia, 1–10 October 2016

October and early November 2016 saw an unprecedented influx of Siberian accentors into western Europe, including first records for Estonia, Germany, the Netherlands and the UK, in some cases attracting national attention and hundreds of birders.

Prior to 2015, only 32 individuals had been recorded in western Europe, the majority in Finland and Sweden, but in October and early November 2016 at least 231 were reported. Records were from the Czech Republic (1), Denmark (11), Estonia (9), Finland (72), Germany (12), Hungary (1), Latvia (9), Lithuania (4), Netherlands (1), Norway (11), Poland (11), Russian Karelia (3), Sweden (71), the UK (14) and Ukraine (2). Four additional birds in Sweden and one in Finland were not positively identified as Siberian, rather than black-throated, accentors. Those birds that were reliably aged all appeared to be in first-winter plumage. (Note: The correct figure for Ukraine may be as many as four.) One of the UK birds lingered in Scotland, where it was found in February 2017.

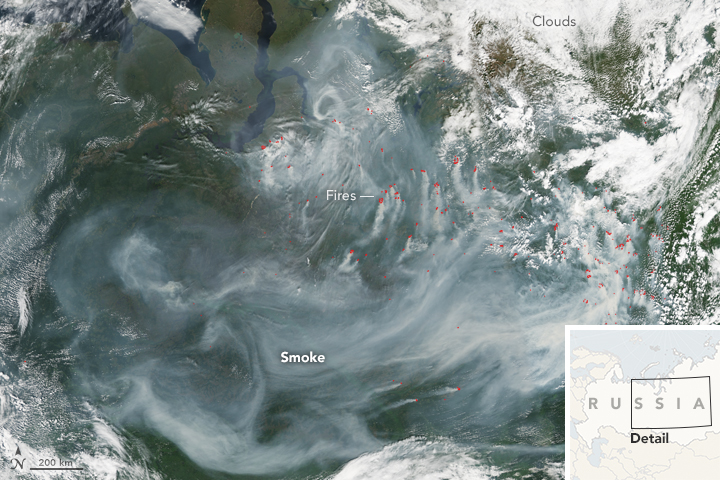
Fires and smoke in Siberia may have forced migrating birds westwards. NASA image for July 22, 2016.

Most of the birds found were on well-watched coasts and islands, and 25% were trapped; in the Baltic states, the proportion of trapped discoveries were much higher, and all finds in Lithuania were of captured birds. It is likely that many more birds were present but were not detected away from the migration watch points and bird observatories, especially in the south and southeast of the Baltic region. The UK Met Office suggested that the influx of accentors was driven by strong and persistent easterly winds from Siberia, partially driven by a high-pressure area centred over Scandinavia. Another weather system produced easterlies in western Asia during the same period.

The weather conditions that carried the accentors so far west also brought large numbers of other Siberian migrants, including a record arrival of yellow-browed warblers in northwest Europe and a sprinkling of extreme eastern rarities such as the UK's first pale-legged leaf warbler and the Netherlands' second eastern crowned warbler.

In addition to the weather systems, other factors leading to the irruption may have included the widespread forest fires in that summer and autumn. In June, 3.5 million hectares (8.6 million acres) of woodland was burning, and by September the smoke cloud extended over several thousand kilometres and reached an altitude of 9 kilometres (5.6 mi). Migrating birds may have moved west to avoid flying through the smoke. The preceding hot summer may also have led to undetected breeding west of the known range involving birds seeking the cooler habitat preferred by this species. There have been suggestions that the accentor influx was augmented by high breeding success in Siberia in 2016, but there is no direct data to support that, and no obvious increase in numbers reaching North America.

== Behaviour ==
Siberian accentors are typically skulking birds, readily disappearing into cover. They have an above average ability to maintain their body temperature in cold conditions, an adaptation to their sometimes cold environment.

=== Breeding ===
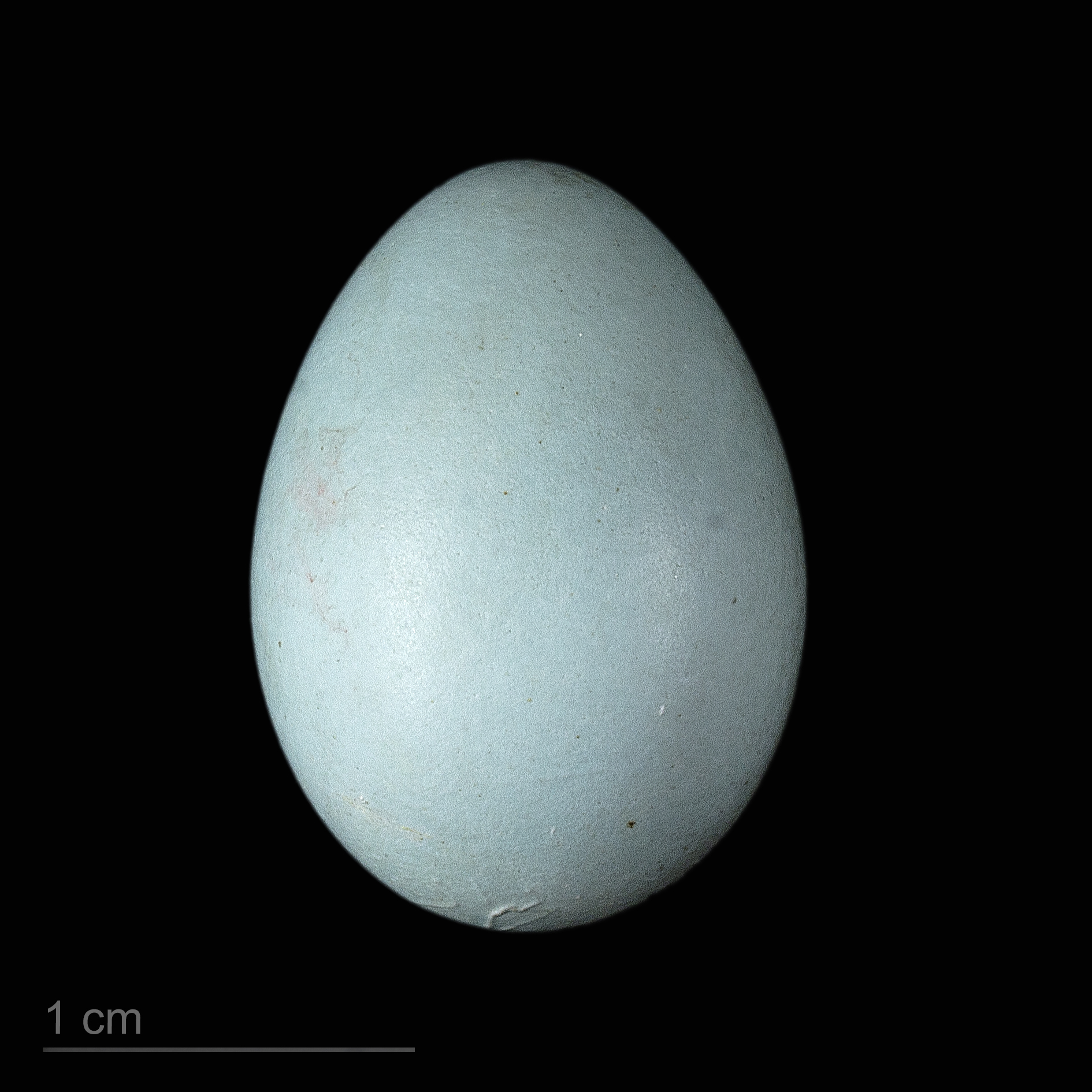
Egg, Muséum de Toulouse

The breeding season of the Siberian accentor is from June to August. Little is known about territorial or breeding behaviour, but birds of the nominate subspecies tend to occur in small groups of two to six closely spaced nests. This clumping does not appear to be shown by the southern subspecies, P. m. badia. The nest is an open cup built 0.4–8 metres (1 ft 4 in – 26 ft 3 in) above the ground in a dense shrub, or where branches fork in a tree. The nest is constructed from coarse vegetation such as twigs and leaves and lined with hair or fine grasses. The eggs are a glossy deep blue-green and measure 18.6 by 13.7 millimetres (0.73 in × 0.54 in); they weigh about 1.9 grams (0.067 oz). The clutch of four to six eggs is incubated by the female for about ten days to hatching and the downy brown-black chicks are then fed by both parents. They can breed in the following year.

Two broods may be produced annually in the south of the range, just one further north.

=== Feeding ===
The Siberian accentor feeds mainly on insects, typically picked off the ground, but sometimes taken from vegetation including bushes and trees, and frequently from near snow fields. Young birds are fed mainly on insects, especially the larvae of beetles, several food items being carried to the nest at each visit.

Seeds may be consumed in winter, and the accentors may also then feed near human habitation. Food plants include crowberry, bistort, and members of the aramanth and birch families.

== Status ==
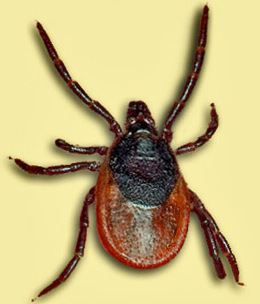
The taiga tick is a parasite of the Siberian accentor

The total population for the Siberian accentor is uncertain, although estimates for the small European part of the range vary from 100 to 500 breeding pairs. The breeding range is estimated as 2.2 million square kilometres (0.85 million sq mi), and the population is considered overall to be large and stable. For this reason, the Siberian accentor is evaluated as a species of least concern by the IUCN, although as a northern breeding species it may in the long term be affected by climate change.

Breeding densities have been recorded as over 30 pairs/km^{2} in northwestern Russia, depending on habitat, generally becoming lower, around 5 pairs/km^{2} in the east of the range. Weather is also a factor, with an atypically high density of 7.4 birds/km^{2} being recorded in the Taymyr Peninsula in 1983. (Note: The equivalents in pairs per mi^{2} are 80, 13.0 and 19.2 respectively)

The Siberian accentor is parasitised by the taiga tick, which can host the spirochaete Borrelia burgdorferi, the cause of Lyme disease.
