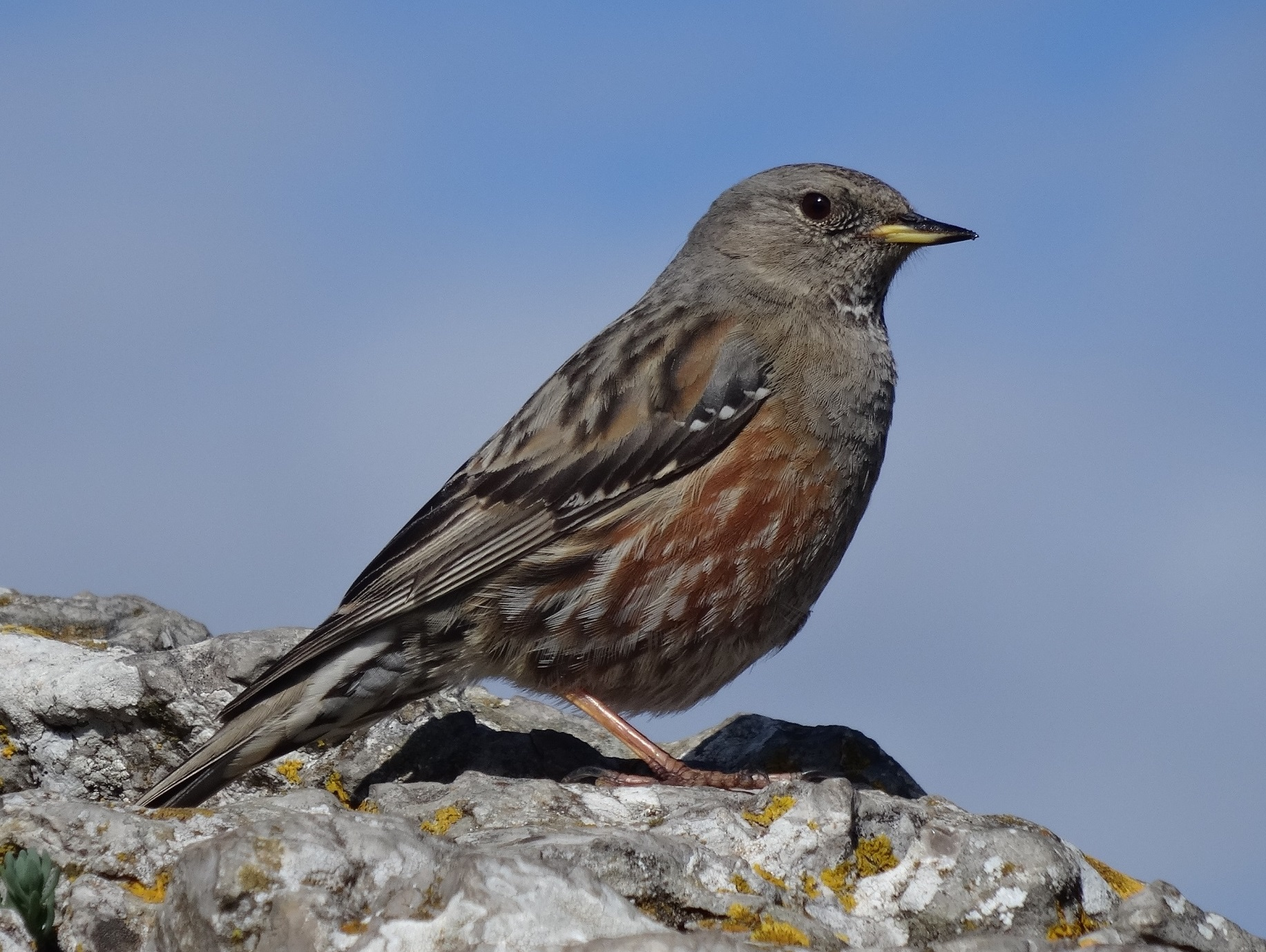

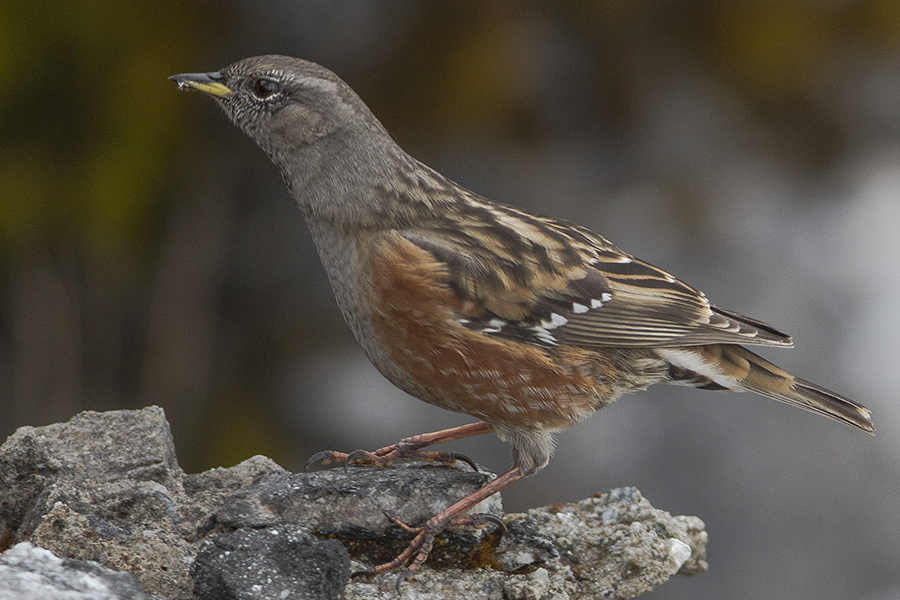
- Nominate subsp. in Hérault, France, and P. c. nipalensis in East Sikkim, India

Conservation status
- Least Concern (IUCN 3.1)

Scientific classification
- Kingdom: Animalia
- Phylum: Chordata
- Class: Aves
- Order: Passeriformes
- Family: Prunellidae
- Genus: Prunella
- Species: P. collaris

Binomial name
- Prunella collaris (Scopoli, 1769)
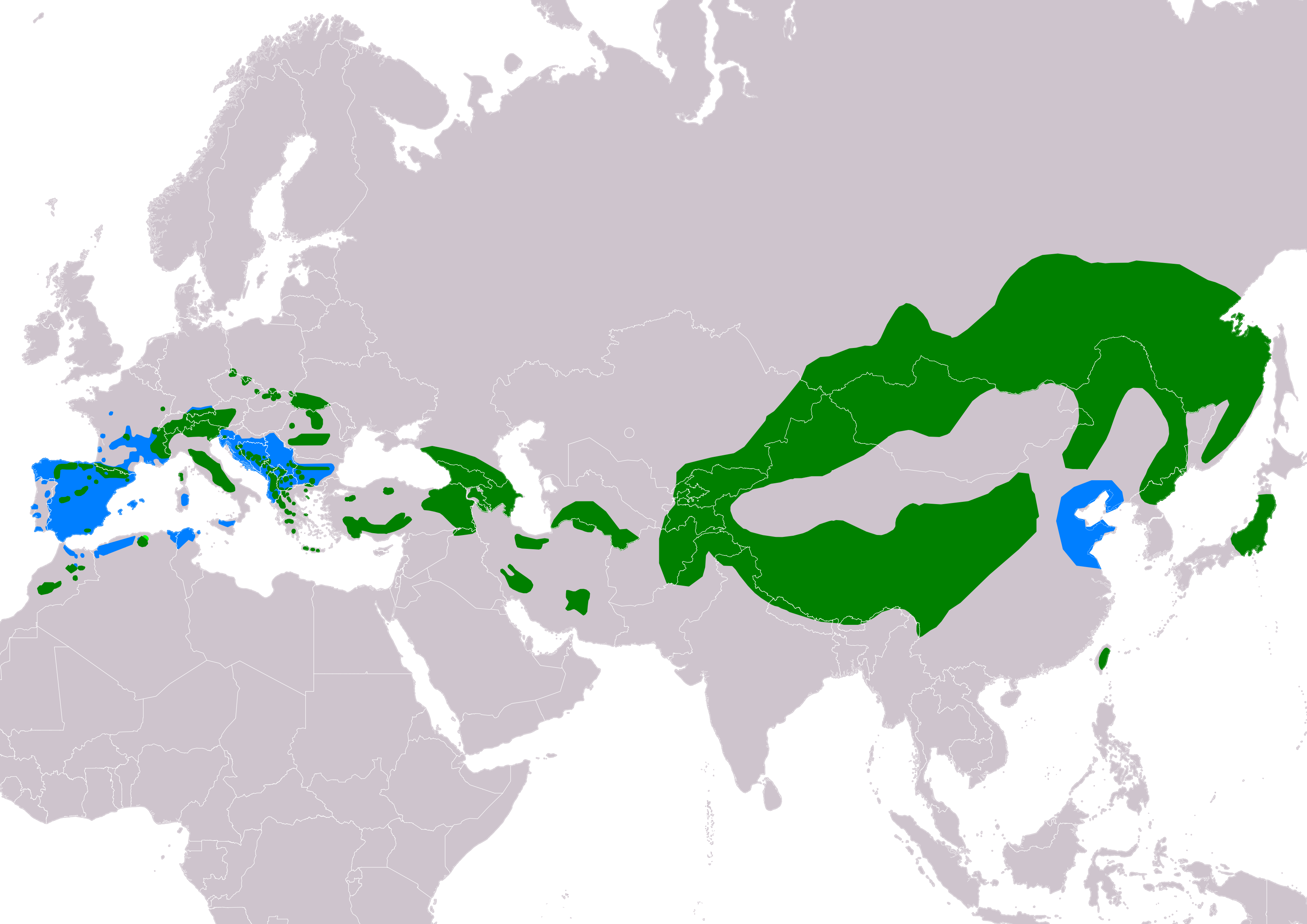
- Global range Summer range Year-round range Winter range

Synonyms
- Laiscopus collaris

= Alpine accentor =

Species of bird

The alpine accentor (Prunella collaris) is a small passerine bird in the family Prunellidae, which is native to Eurasia and North Africa.

== Taxonomy ==
The Alpine accentor was described by the Italian naturalist Giovanni Antonio Scopoli in 1769. He coined the binomial name Sturnus collaris and specified the type locality as the Carinthia region of southern Austria. The specific epithet is from the Latin collaris "of the neck". This species is now placed in the genus Prunella that was introduced by the French ornithologist Louis Pierre Vieillot in 1816. The Alpine accentor, along with the Altai accentor is sometimes separated from the other accentors, into the genus Laiscopus.

The word "accentor" is from post-classical Latin and means a person who sings with another. The genus name Prunella is from the German Braunelle, "dunnock", a diminutive of braun, "brown".

Nine subspecies are recognised:

- P. c. collaris (Scopoli, 1769) — southwest Europe to Slovenia and the Carpathians, northwest Africa
- P. c. subalpina (Brehm, CL, 1831) — Croatia to Bulgaria and Greece, Crete and southwest Turkey
- P. c. montana (Hablizl, 1783) — north and east Turkey to the Caucasus and Iran
- P. c. rufilata (Severtzov, 1879) — northeast Afghanistan and north Pakistan through the mountains of central Asia to west China
- P. c. whymperi (Baker, ECS, 1915) — west Himalayas
- P. c. nipalensis (Blyth, 1843) — central and east Himalayas to southcentral China and north Myanmar
- P. c. tibetana (Bianchi, 1905) — east Tibet
- P. c. erythropygia (R. Swinhoe, 1870) — east Kazakhstan and southcentral Siberia to northeast Siberia, Japan, Korea and northeast China
- P. c. fennelli Deignan, 1964 — Taiwan

== Description ==
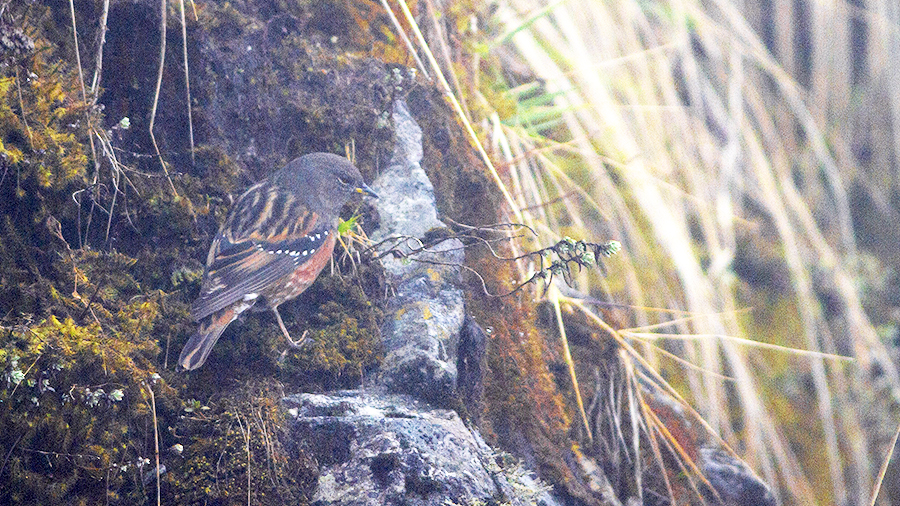
P. c. nipalensis at Pangolakha Wildlife Sanctuary in East Sikkim, India

This is a robin-sized bird at 15–17.5 cm (5.9–6.9 in) in length, slightly larger than its relative, the dunnock. It has a streaked brown back, somewhat resembling a house sparrow, but adults have an all-grey head and red-brown spotting on the underparts. It has an insectivore's fine pointed bill.

Sexes are similar, although the male may be contrasted in appearance. Young birds have browner heads and underparts.

== Distribution and habitat ==
It is found throughout the mountains of southern temperate Europe, Lebanon and Asia at heights above 2,000 m (6,600 ft). It is mainly resident, wintering more widely at lower latitudes, but some birds wander as rare vagrants as far as Great Britain.

It is a bird of bare mountain areas with some low vegetation.

== Breeding ==
It builds a neat nest low in a bush or rock crevice, laying 3–5 unspotted sky-blue eggs.

The mating system is of particular interest. Home ranges are occupied by breeding groups of three or four males with three or four females. These are unrelated birds which have a socially polygynandrous mating system. Males have a dominance hierarchy, with the alpha males being generally older than subordinates. Females seek matings with all the males, although the alpha male may defend her against matings from lower ranking males. In turn, males seek matings with all the females. DNA fingerprinting has been used to show that, within broods, there is often mixed paternity, although the female is always the true mother of the nestlings raised within her nest. Males will provide food to chicks at several nests within the group, depending on whether they have mated with the female or not – males only provide care when they are likely to be the true fathers of the chicks.

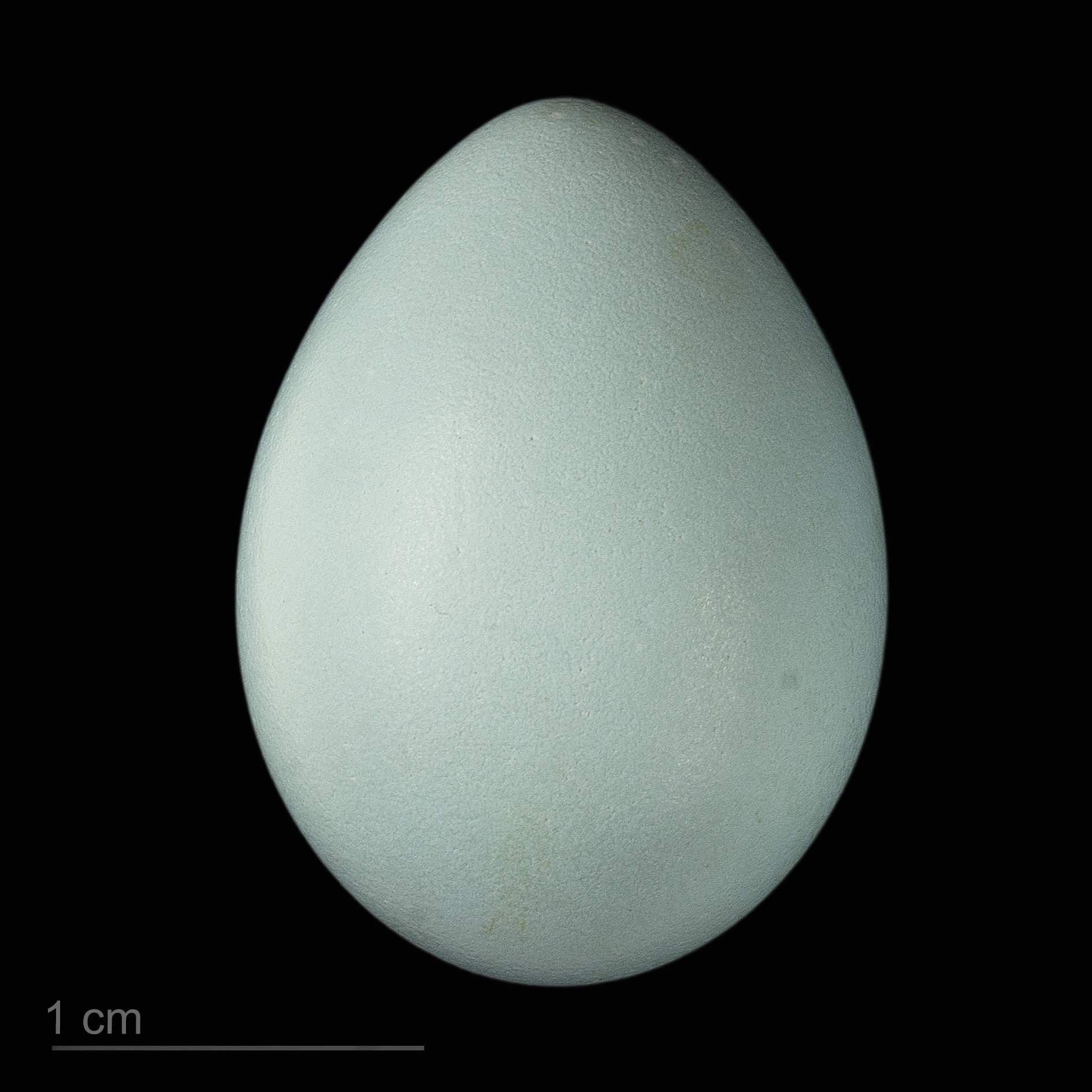
Prunella collaris collaris—Muséum de Toulouse (MHNT)
