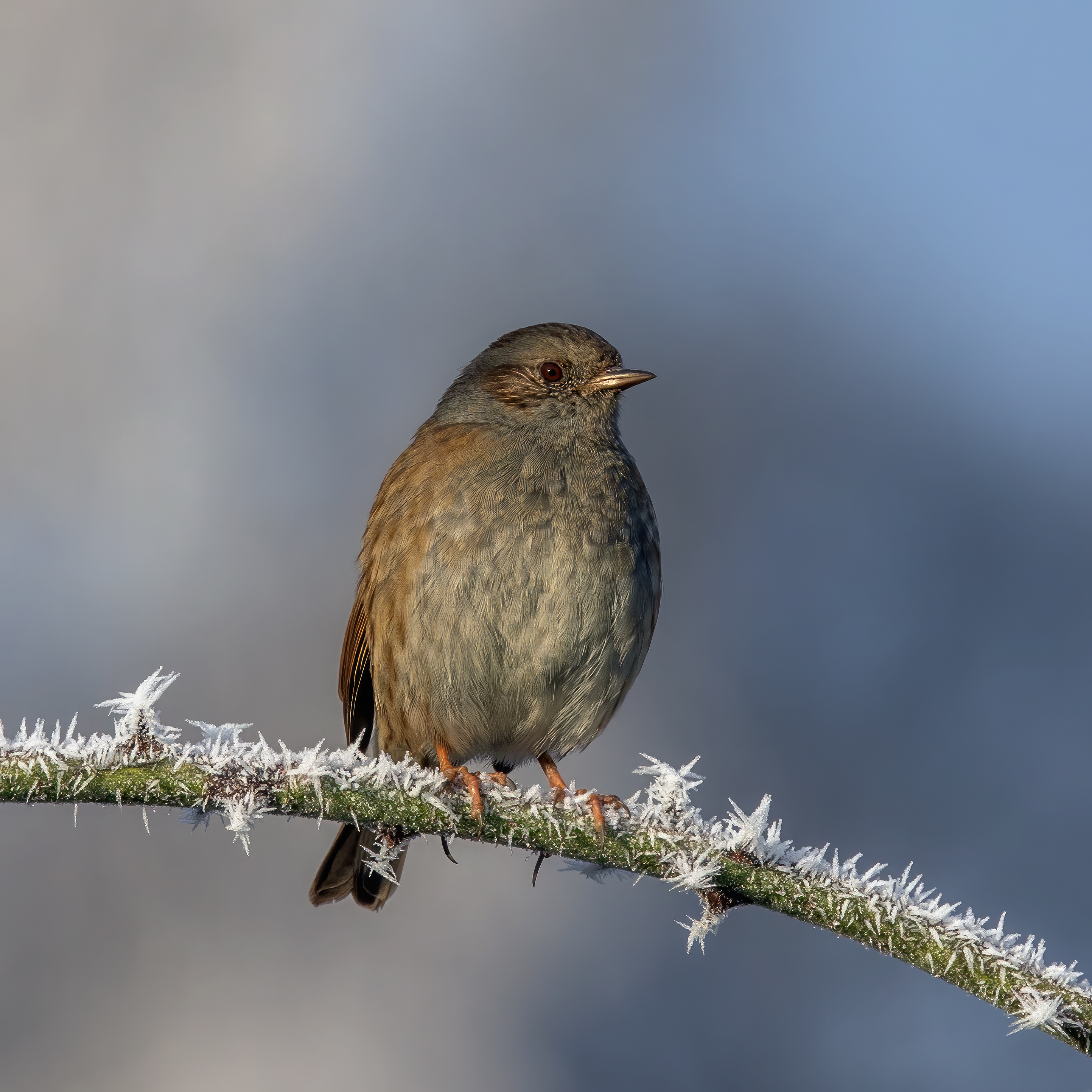
- Dunnock (Prunella modularis)

Scientific classification
- Kingdom: Animalia
- Phylum: Chordata
- Class: Aves
- Order: Passeriformes
- Parvorder: Passerida
- Family: Prunellidae; Richmond, 1908
- Genus: Prunella; Vieillot, 1816

Type species
- Prunella modularis Linnaeus, 1758

Species
- See text.

Synonyms
- Laiscopus; Accentor

= Accentor =

Genus of birds

The accentors are a genus of birds in the family Prunellidae, which is endemic to the Old World. This small group of closely related passerines are all in the genus Prunella. All but the dunnock and the Japanese accentor are inhabitants of the mountainous regions of Europe and Asia; these two also occur in lowland areas, as does the Siberian accentor in the far north of Siberia. These birds are not strongly migratory, but they will leave the coldest parts of their range in winter and make altitudinal movements.

== Taxonomy and etymology ==
The genus Prunella was introduced by the French ornithologist Louis Vieillot in 1816 with the dunnock (Prunella modularis) as the type species. Although the genus is usually used for all the accentors, the alpine accentor and Altai accentor are sometimes separated into the genus Laiscopus.

Harrison used the group name dunnock for all of the species, not just Prunella modularis (thus e.g. Japanese dunnock for P. rubida); this usage is based on the oldest known name for any of the species (Old English dun-, brown, + -ock, small: "little brown bird"). Accentor derives from the old scientific name for the Alpine accentor (Accentor collaris). It comes from Late Latin, meaning "sing with another" (ad + cantor). The genus name Prunella is from the German Braunelle, "dunnock", a diminutive of braun, "brown".

== Description ==
These are small, fairly drab species superficially similar, but not closely related to, sparrows. They are 14 to 18 cm (5.5 to 7.1 in) in length, and weigh between 25 and 35 g (0.88 and 1.23 oz). However, accentors have thin sharp bills, reflecting their diet of ground-dwelling insects in summer, augmented with small seeds and berries in winter. They may also swallow grit and sand to help their stomach break up these seeds.

Most of the species live together in flocks. The dunnock is an exception since it prefers to be solitary except when feeding. The dunnock also earned a nickname of "shuffle-wing" since it most strongly displays the characteristic wing flicks used during courtship and other displays.

Accentors may have one to three broods a year. Courtship consists of a great deal of song from the males, which may include short lark-like song flights to attract a mate. In most species, the male and female share in the nest making, with the dunnocks again being an exception; their males have no part in nest building or incubation. They build neat cup nests and lay 3–6 unspotted green or blue eggs. The eggs are incubated for around 12 days. The young are fed by both parents and take an additional 12 days or so to fledge.

== Habitat ==
Their typical habitat is mountainous regions in an area far above the tree-line, but below the snow-line. The Alpine accentor has been observed at nearly 8,000 m (26,000 ft) altitude in the Himalaya and the Altai and Robin accentors at 5,500 m (18,000 ft); however, most accentors breed in scrub vegetation at lower levels. Most species are altitudinal migrants, descending to lower altitudes to spend the winter, but some are long-distance migrants, most notably the Siberian accentor, which migrates 3,000–5,000 km from northern Siberia to China and Korea. Accentors spend the majority of their time in the undergrowth and even when flushed, stay low to the ground until reaching cover.

== Species list ==
Twelve species are currently accepted:

Genus Prunella – Vieillot, 1816 – 12 species
Common name	Scientific name and subspecies	Range	Size and ecology	IUCN status and estimated population
Alpine accentor	Prunella collaris (Scopoli, 1769) Nine subspecies: P. c. collaris (Scopoli, 1769): southwest Europe to Slovenia and the Carpathians, northwest Africa; P. c. subalpina (Brehm, CL, 1831): Croatia to Bulgaria and Greece, Crete and southwest Turkey; P. c. montana (Hablizl, 1783): north and east Turkey to the Caucasus and Iran; P. c. rufilata (Severtzov, 1879): northeast Afghanistan and north Pakistan through the mountains of central Asia to west China; P. c. whymperi (Baker, ECS, 1915): west Himalayas; P. c. nipalensis (Blyth, 1843): central and east Himalayas to southcentral China and north Myanmar; P. c. tibetana (Bianchi, 1905): east Tibet; P. c. erythropygia (R. Swinhoe, 1870): east Kazakhstan and southcentral Siberia to northeast Siberia, Japan, Korea and northeast China; P. c. fennelli Deignan, 1964: Taiwan	Mountains of southern Europe, North Africa, Lebanon and Asia (east to Japan, Korea, Taiwan and northeast China)	Size: 15–17.5 cm (5.9–6.9 in) Habitat: Bare mountain areas with some low vegetation, at heights above 2,000 m (6,600 ft) Diet: Insectivorous (fine pointed bill)	LC
Altai accentor	Prunella himalayana (Blyth, 1842)	Breeds in southern Russia (Altai eastward to the mountains east of Lake Baikal), northwestern Mongolia, the Tian Shan, the Pamir and northeastern Afghanistan; winters in the Himalayas, at least east to Bhutan	Size: 15–15.5 cm (5.9–6.1 in) Habitat: Sparsely vegetated, rocky alpine meadows, at 2,800–5,000 m (9,200–16,400 ft) Diet: Invertebrates in the breeding season; berries added in winter	LC Stable
Robin accentor	Prunella rubeculoides (Moore, 1854) Two subspecies: P. r. muraria (Meinertzhagen, R & Meinertzhagen, A, 1926): west Himalayas; P. r. rubeculoides (Moore, F, 1854): central and east Himalayas to central China	Mountainous regions of Afghanistan, Pakistan, India, Nepal, Bhutan and China (Tibet Autonomous Region, Qinghai, Gansu and Sichuan)	Size: About 17 cm (6.7 in) Habitat: Grassland and scrub, often in gullies containing streams, above the tree-line but below the snowline, at about 3,000–5,500 m (9,800–18,000 ft); may move to slightly lower elevations in winter Diet: Forages on the ground for insects, other invertebrates and seeds; small groups may feed together	LC Stable; common in parts of its range
Rufous-breasted accentor	Prunella strophiata (Blyth, 1843) Two subspecies: P. s. jerdoni (Brooks, WE, 1872): east Afghanistan and west Himalayas; P. s. strophiata (Blyth, 1843): central and east Himalayas to central China and north Myanmar	Himalayas, descending in winter to lower-to-middle altitudes: Afghanistan, Bhutan, Tibet, China, India, Myanmar, Nepal and Pakistan	Size: Habitat: Temperate forest Diet:	LC
Siberian accentor	Prunella montanella (Pallas, 1776) Two subspecies: P. m. montanella (Pallas, 1776): northern Russia from just inside Europe eastwards to the Lena River; also further south, from the Ob to the Amur; P. m. badia (Portenko, 1929): northeastern Siberia eastwards from the Lena, and south to the Sea of Okhotsk	Breeds in northern Russia from the Ural Mountains eastwards across Siberia; winters in Korea and eastern China, with small numbers in Mongolia. Breeding summer visitor Winter visitor (ranges are very approximate)	Size: 14.5 cm (5.7 in) Habitat: Breeding: subarctic willow and birch forests and open coniferous woodland, often close to rivers or bogs; also mountains and spruce taiga. Winter: bushes and shrubs, often near streams, and dry grassland and woods Diet: Mainly insects, typically picked off the ground but sometimes taken from vegetation; seeds may be eaten in winter	LC Large and stable
Brown accentor	Prunella fulvescens (Severtsov, 1873)	Afghanistan, China, India, Kazakhstan, Mongolia, Nepal, Pakistan, Russia, Tajikistan, Turkmenistan and Uzbekistan	Size: Habitat: Mediterranean-type shrubby vegetation, preferring drier habitats than other accentors; breeds at 3,300–5,100 m (10,800–16,700 ft) Diet: Adults eat seeds, fruits and insects; nestlings only insects	LC Stable; common in Central Asia
Radde's accentor	Prunella ocularis (Radde, 1884) Two subspecies: P. o. ocularis (Radde, 1884): montane Turkey through Turkmenistan, Iran and Afghanistan; P. o. fagani (Ogilvie-Grant, 1913): far western Yemen; formerly considered a separate species, the Arabian accentor, lumped in 2018)	Mountainous parts of Yemen and northern Southwest Asia (montane Turkey through Turkmenistan, Iran and Afghanistan)	Size: Habitat: Temperate grassland Diet:	LC
Black-throated accentor	Prunella atrogularis (Brandt, 1843) Two subspecies: P. a. atrogularis: breeds in the northern and central Ural Mountains of northwestern Russia; winters in eastern Iran, Turkmenistan and Uzbekistan, south to Afghanistan and the southwestern Indian subcontinent; P. a. huttoni: breeds in Central Asia, from the Altai Mountains south to the Tian Shan and Pamir Mountains; winters in southwest Asia	Breeds in the Ural, Tian Shan and Altai Mountains; winters in Afghanistan and neighbouring countries. Range of P. atrogularis as compiled by BirdLife International and Handbook of the Birds of the World (2016). Breeding Resident Non-breeding	Size: 13.5–14 cm (5.3–5.5 in) Habitat: Nests low in spruce thickets; winters in scrub or cultivation Diet: Insectivorous (fine pointed bill)	LC Stable
Kozlov's accentor	Prunella koslowi (Przewalski, 1887)	Mongolia and northern China	Size: Habitat: Diet:	LC
Dunnock	Prunella modularis (Linnaeus, 1758) Seven subspecies: P. m. hebridium (Meinertzhagen, R, 1934): Ireland and the Hebrides (west of Scotland); P. m. occidentalis (Hartert, 1910): Scotland (except the Hebrides), England, Wales and west France; P. m. modularis (Linnaeus, 1758): north and central, and southeast Europe; P. m. fuscata (Mauersberger, 1971): south Crimean Peninsula; P. m. euxina (Watson, 1961): northwest and north Turkey; P. m. mabbotti (Harper, 1919): Iberian Peninsula, south-central France and Italy; P. m. obscura (Hablizl, 1783): northeast Turkey, Caucasus and north Iran	Temperate Europe and southwest Asia (including Lebanon, northern Iran and the Caucasus) into Asian Russia; introduced to New Zealand. Summer range Year-round range Winter range Non-native range	Size: 13–14.5 cm (5.1–5.7 in) Habitat: Woodlands, shrubs, gardens and hedgerows; the only accentor commonly found in temperate lowland areas Diet: Feeds on the ground, often seeking out detritivores	LC
Japanese accentor	Prunella rubida (Temminck & Schlegel, 1847)	Japan and Sakhalin	Size: Habitat: Temperate forest Diet:	LC
Maroon-backed accentor	Prunella immaculata (Hodgson, 1845)	Bhutan, China, India, Myanmar and Nepal	Size: Habitat: Temperate forest Diet:	LC
