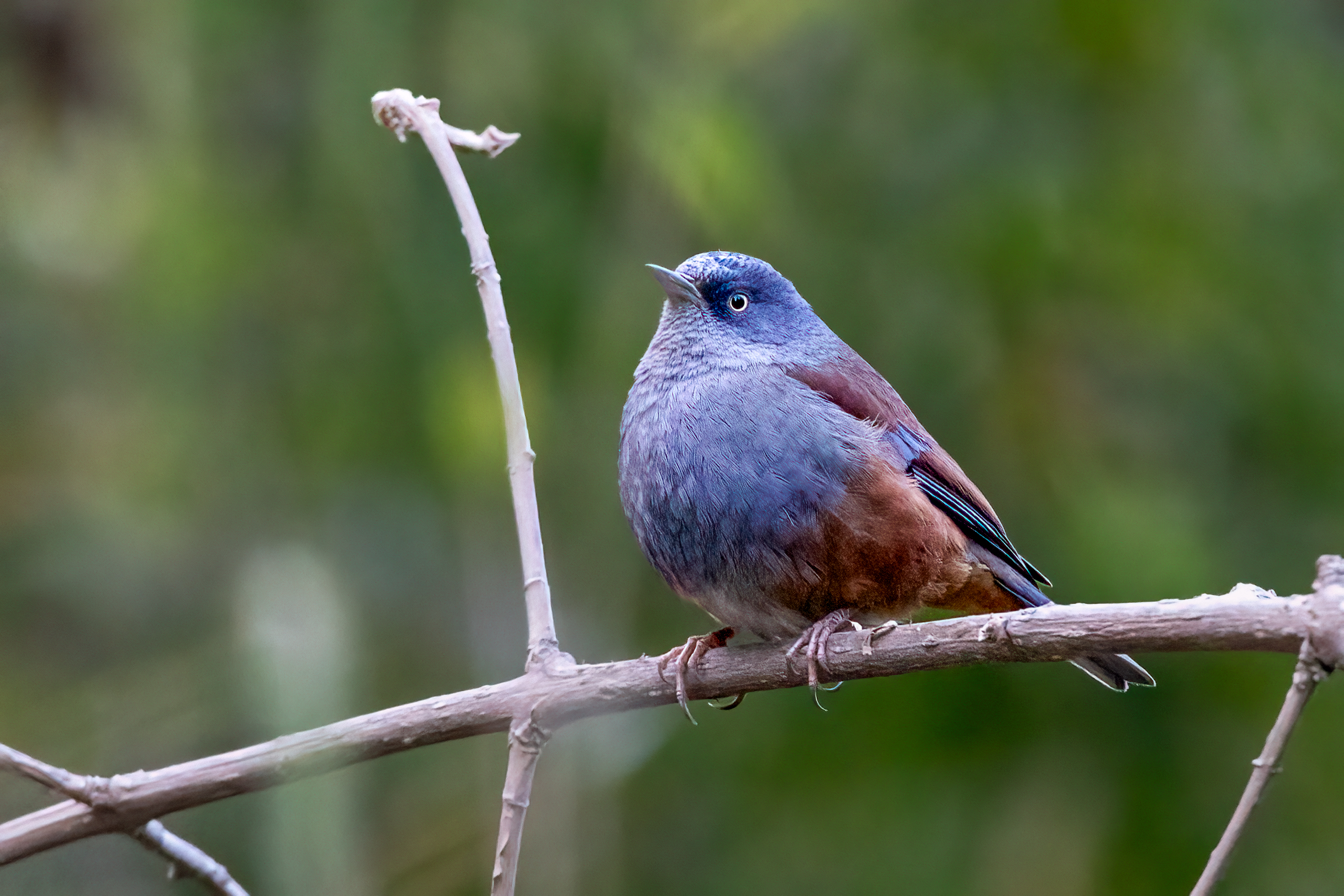
- in Phoolchowki Hills, Lalitpur, Nepal

Conservation status
- Least Concern (IUCN 3.1)

Scientific classification
- Kingdom: Animalia
- Phylum: Chordata
- Class: Aves
- Order: Passeriformes
- Family: Prunellidae
- Genus: Prunella
- Species: P. immaculata

Binomial name
- Prunella immaculata (Hodgson, 1845)

= Maroon-backed accentor =

Species of bird

The maroon-backed accentor (Prunella immaculata) is a species of bird in the family Prunellidae. It is found in Bhutan, China, India, Myanmar, and Nepal.

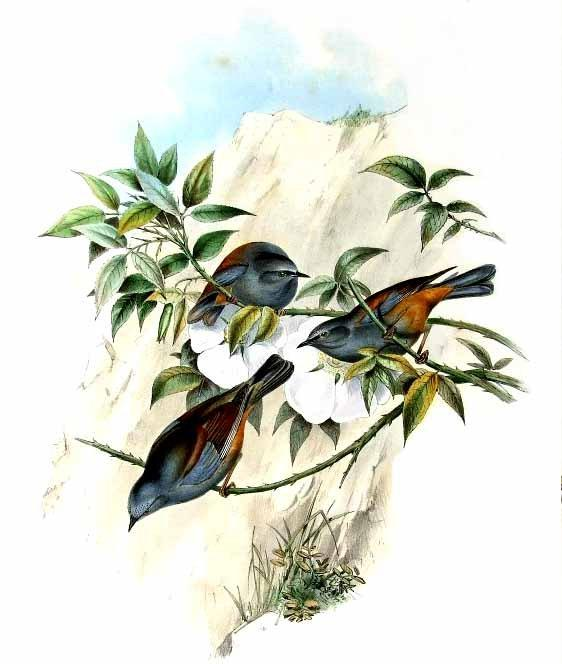
John Gould's illustration.

Its natural habitat is temperate forest.
