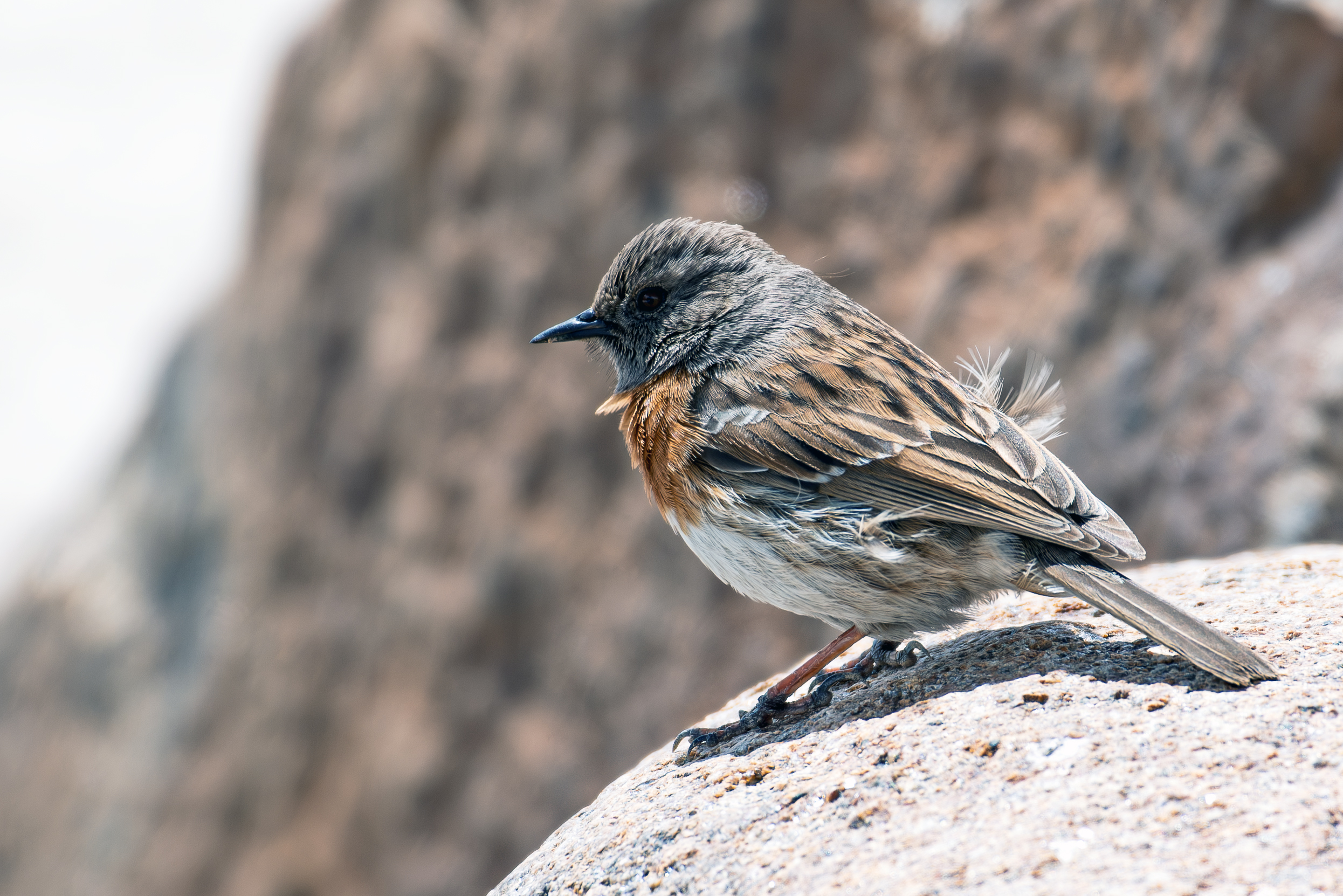
- At Leh, Ladakh, India

Conservation status
- Least Concern (IUCN 3.1)

Scientific classification
- Kingdom: Animalia
- Phylum: Chordata
- Class: Aves
- Order: Passeriformes
- Family: Prunellidae
- Genus: Prunella
- Species: P. rubeculoides

Binomial name
- Prunella rubeculoides (Moore, F, 1854)

= Robin accentor =

Species of bird

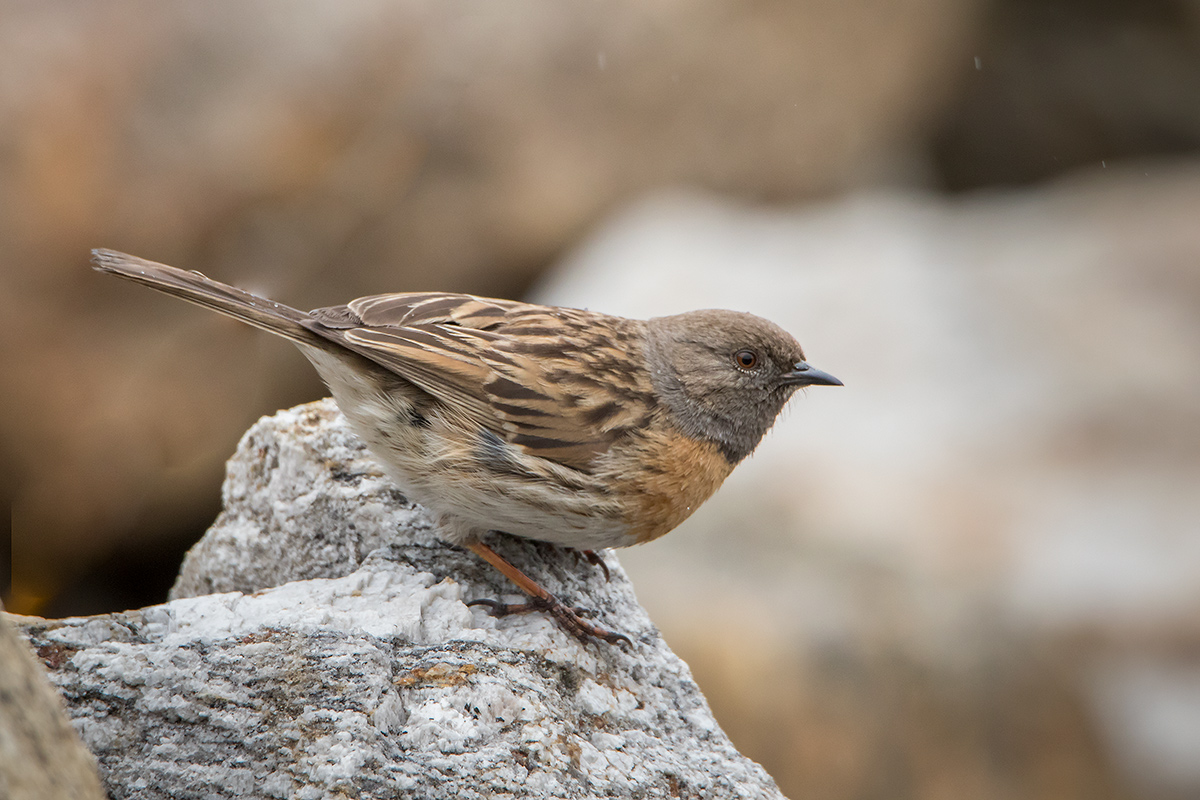
Robin Accentor Male at Gnathang Valley, in East Sikkim, India

The robin accentor (Prunella rubeculoides) is a species of bird in the family Prunellidae. It is found in the mountainous regions of Afghanistan, Pakistan, India, Nepal, Bhutan and China, at altitudes between about 3,000 and 5,500 m (9,800 and 18,000 ft). It is a brown bird with a grey head and an orange-red breast. It is common in parts of its range and its conservation status has been assessed by the International Union for Conservation of Nature as being of "least concern".

== Taxonomy ==
The robin accentor was described by the English entomologist and ornithologist Frederic Moore in 1854 from a specimen collected in Nepal. He coined the binomial name Accentor rubeculoides. The specific epithet combines the Medieval Latin rubecula for a "robin" and the Ancient Greek -oidēs "resembling". The robin accentor is now placed in the genus Prunella that was introduced by the French ornithologist Louis Pierre Vieillot in 1816.

There are two subspecies:

- P. r. muraria Meinertzhagen, R & Meinertzhagen, A, 1926 – west Himalayas
- P. r. rubeculoides (Moore, F, 1854) – central and east Himalayas to central China

== Description ==
The robin accentor is a large accentor, growing to a length of about 17 cm (7 in). The sexes are similar in appearance and have the slender, sharply-pointed beak typical of an insect-eating bird. The head and neck are grey while the other upper parts are brown, streaked with black. The throat is a uniform shade of reddish-orange and the belly pale buff. The wing coverts have white tips. The call is a high trill, or a repeated "tszi tszi". The song is musical and has been rendered as "si-tsi-si-tsi-tsu-tsitsi".

== Distribution and habitat ==
The robin accentor is native to mountainous regions of Pakistan, India, Bhutan, Nepal and China, and is also present in Afghanistan, typically at altitudes between 3,000 and 5,500 m (9,800 and 18,000 ft). In China it is known from the Tibet Autonomous Region and the provinces of Qinghai, Gansu and Sichuan. It is a non-migratory species normally resident above the tree-line but not as high as the snowline. It is usually seen on the ground in grassland or among scrub, often in gullies containing streams. In the winter it may move to slightly lower elevations and is often found in stony areas close to human habitations.

== Behaviour ==
The robin accentor mostly forages on the ground for insects, other invertebrates and seeds. Small groups of birds may feed together. A female often mates with several males, and each male attempts to remove any sperm already present in her cloaca before himself mounting her. The nest is built off the ground in tussock grass, bushes or scrub. It is cup-shaped, and a clutch of about four blue or green, unspeckled eggs is laid. The breeding season is between May and August and there may be two broods.

== Status ==
The robin accentor has a wide range and is common in parts of that range. No particular threats have been identified and the population seems stable, so the International Union for Conservation of Nature has assessed its conservation status as being of "least concern".
