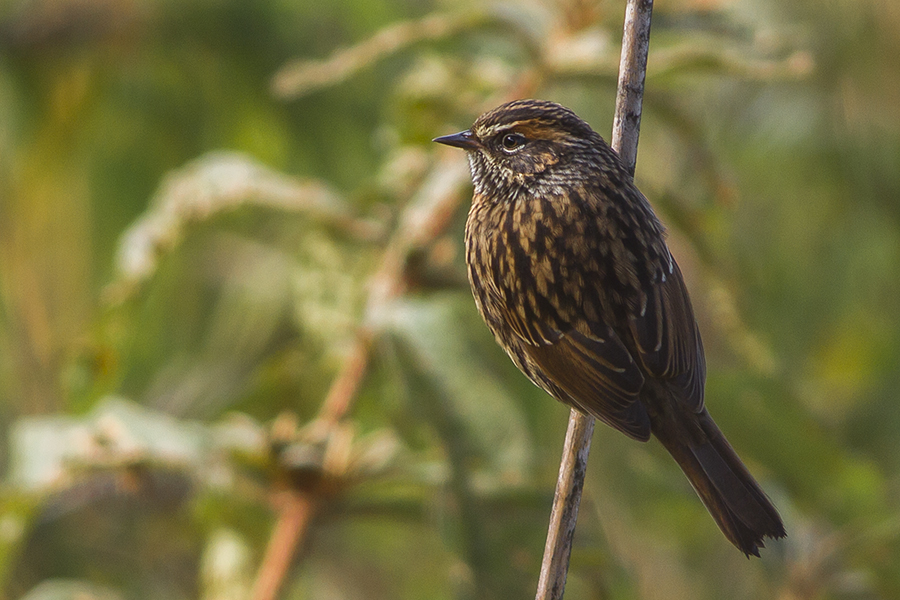
- From Lungthu (~11,000 ft) in Sikkim, India.

Conservation status
- Least Concern (IUCN 3.1)

Scientific classification
- Kingdom: Animalia
- Phylum: Chordata
- Class: Aves
- Order: Passeriformes
- Family: Prunellidae
- Genus: Prunella
- Species: P. strophiata

Binomial name
- Prunella strophiata (Blyth, 1843)

= Rufous-breasted accentor =

Species of bird

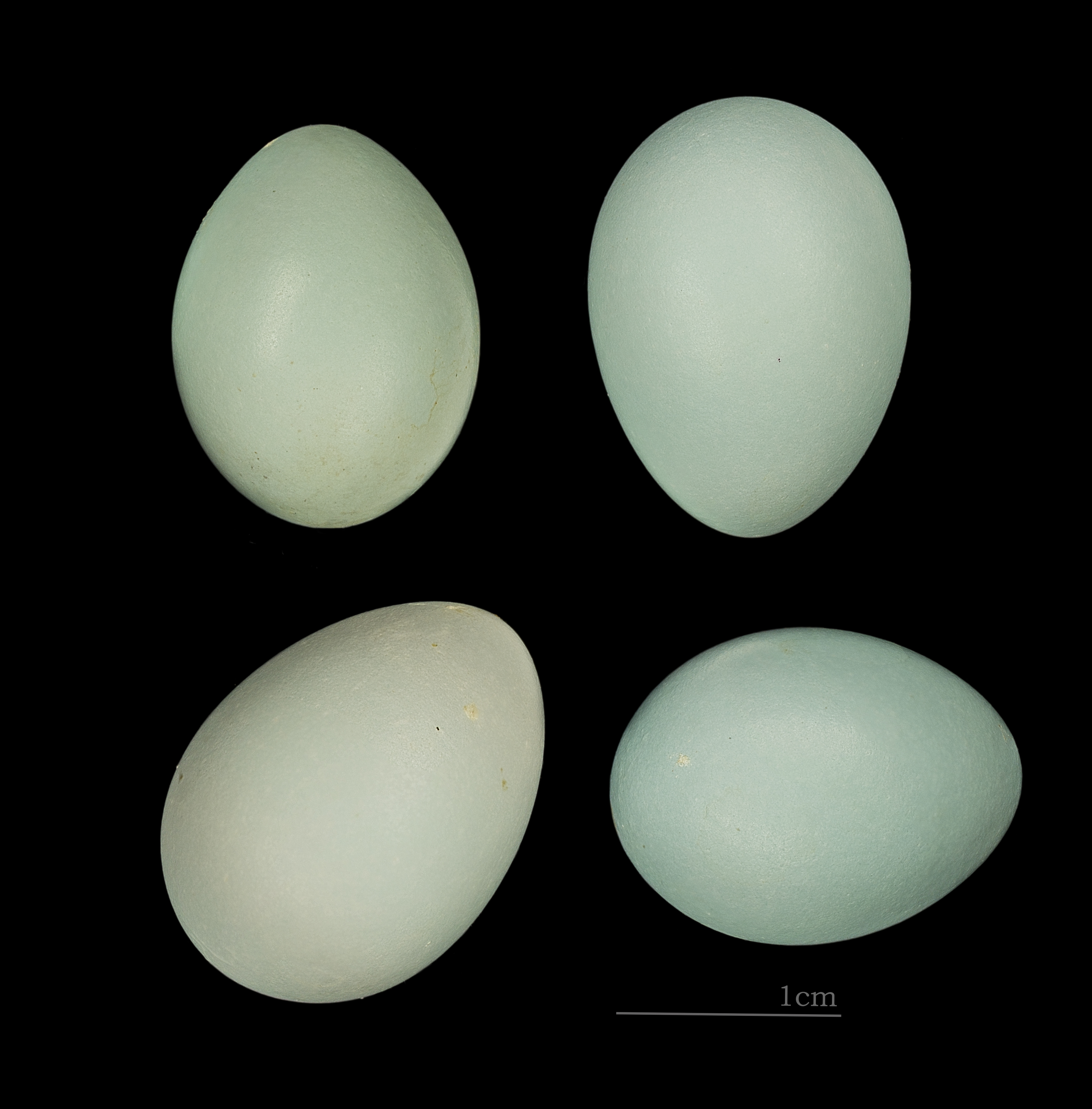
Eggs of Prunella strophiata MHNT

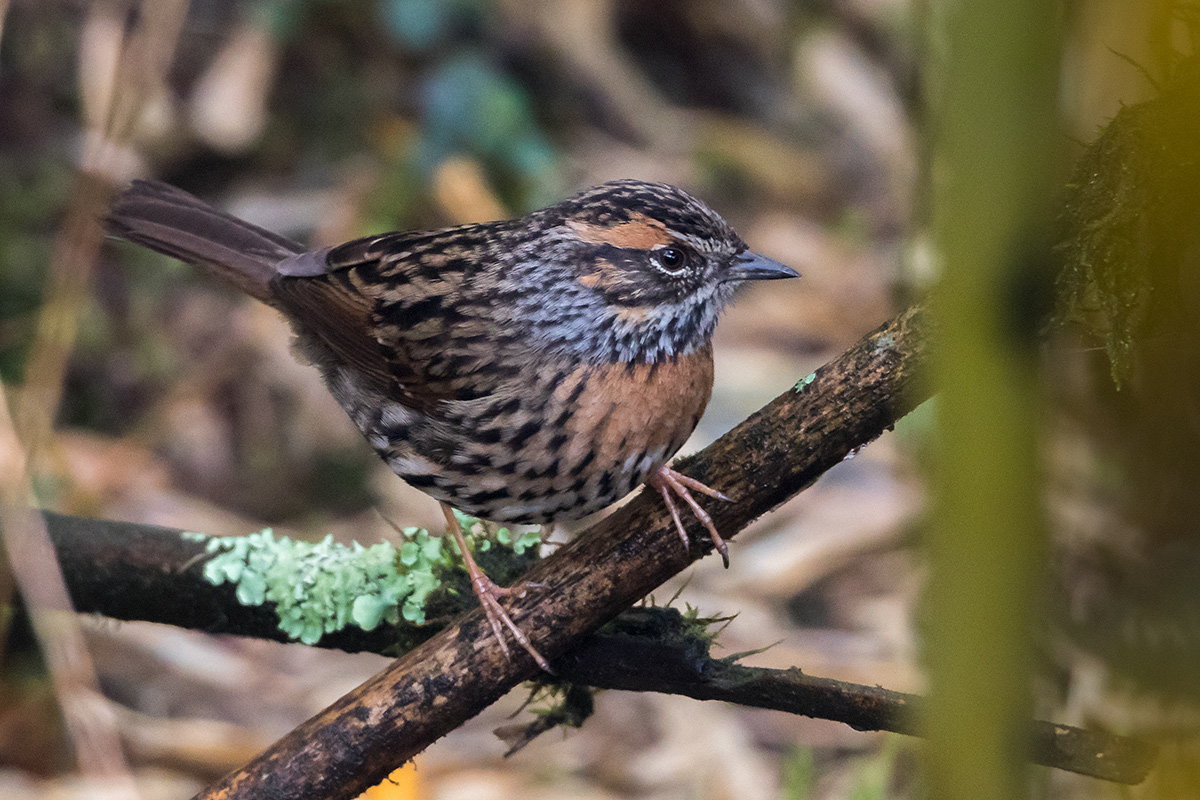
Individual in Zuluk Sikkim

The rufous-breasted accentor (Prunella strophiata) is passerine bird in the family Prunellidae, endemic to the Himalayas, descending in the winter to lower-to-middle altitudes. It is found in Afghanistan, Bhutan, Tibet, China, India, Myanmar, Nepal, and Pakistan.

Its natural habitat is temperate forest.

== Taxonomy ==
The rufous-breasted accentor was described by the English zoologist Edward Blyth in 1843 from a specimen collected in Nepal. He coined the binomial name Accentor strophiatus. The specific epithet strophiatus/strophiata is from Latin strophium "breast-band". The rufous-breasted accentor is now placed in the genus Prunella that was introduced by the French ornithologist Louis Vieillot in 1816.

Two subspecies are recognised:

- P. s. jerdoni (Brooks, WE, 1872) – east Afghanistan and west Himalayas
- P. s. strophiata (Blyth, 1843) – central and east Himalayas to central China and north Myanmar

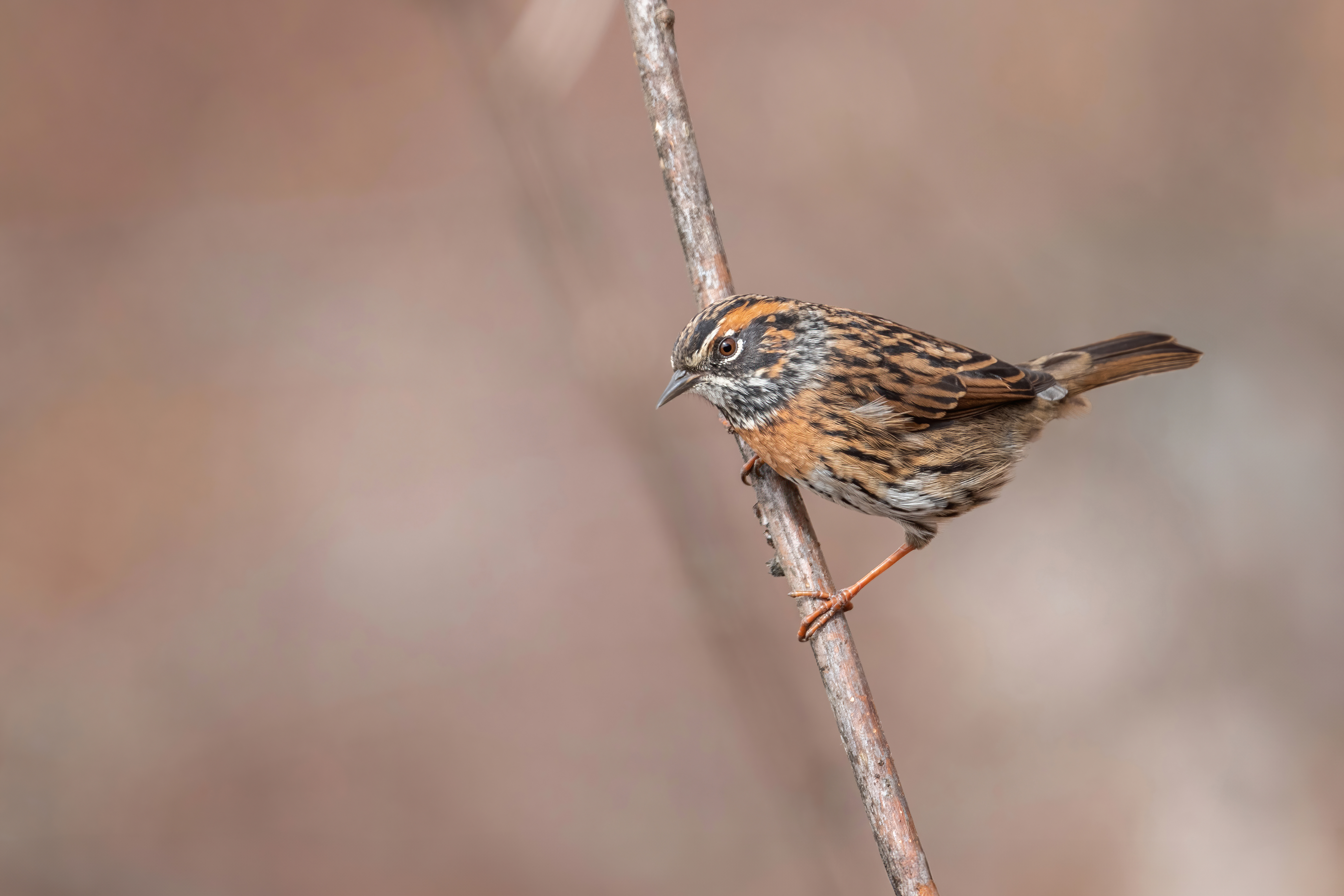
P. s. strophiata at Helambu, Nepal.
