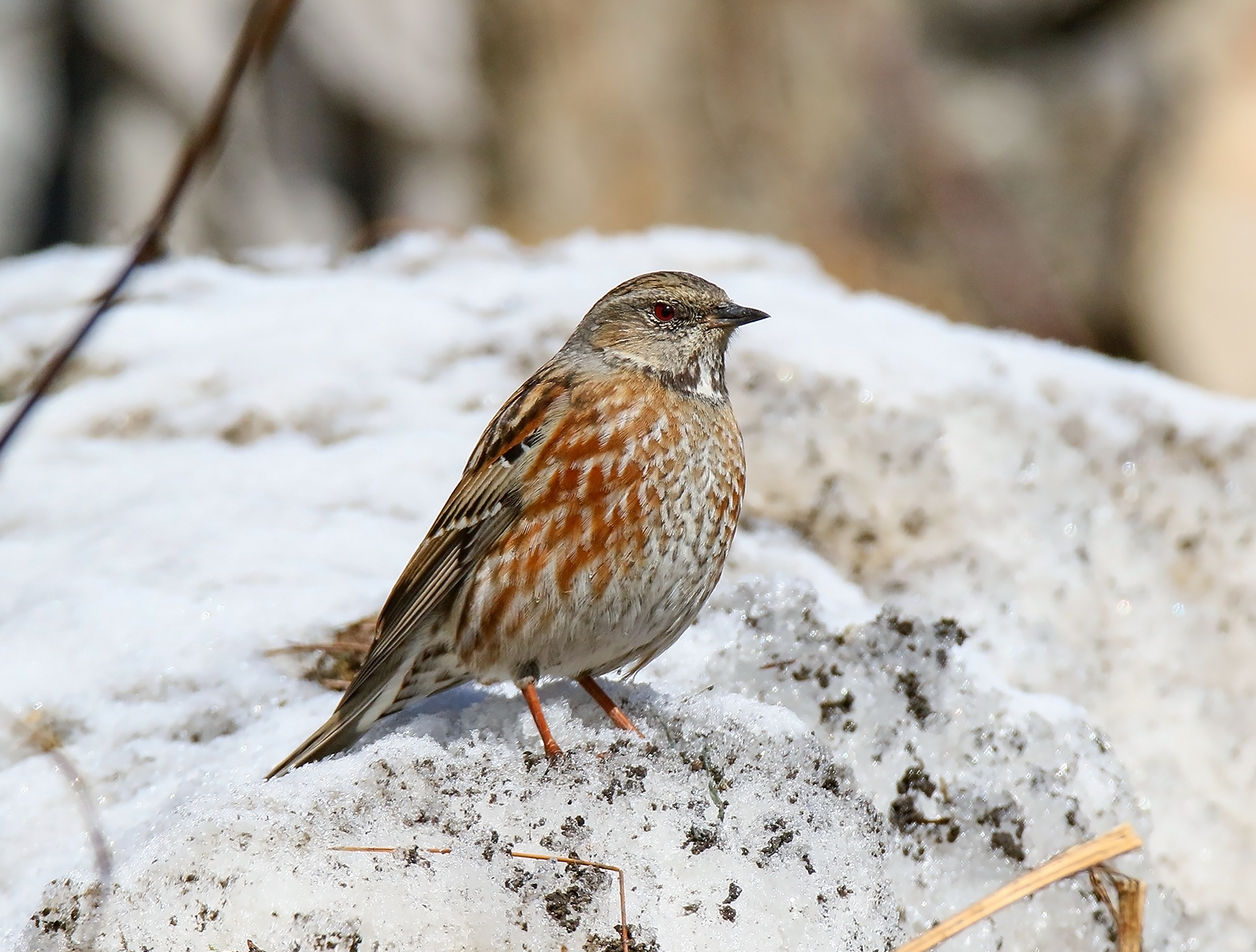
- Altai Accentor, Pakistan

Conservation status
- Least Concern (IUCN 3.1)

Scientific classification
- Kingdom: Animalia
- Phylum: Chordata
- Class: Aves
- Order: Passeriformes
- Family: Prunellidae
- Genus: Prunella
- Species: P. himalayana

Binomial name
- Prunella himalayana (Blyth, 1842)

Synonyms
- Laiscopus himalayanus

= Altai accentor =

Species of bird

The Altai accentor (Prunella himalayana) is a species of bird in the family Prunellidae. It is also known as the rufous-streaked accentor or Himalayan accentor. It breeds in the Altai Mountains of western Mongolia; it winters in the southern Tian Shan and Himalayan ranges.

== Taxonomy ==
The Altai accentor was described by the English zoologist Edward Blyth in 1842 and given the binomial name Accentor himalayanus. The Altai accentor is now placed in the genus Prunella that was introduced by the French ornithologist Louis Pierre Vieillot in 1816. The species is monotypic.

This species, along with the alpine accentor, is sometimes separated from the other accentors into the genus Laiscopus.

== Description ==
This accentor is a relatively large member of its family, measuring 15-15.5 cm in length. It has a gray head, a white throat framed by black spots, and a chestnut-brown with dark streaks back and mantle. The upperparts are a paler shade of brown. The wings are rusty brown with two distinct white wing bars, and the underside is white with rusty red spots on the breast and flanks.

== Ecology ==
=== Distribution ===
The altai accentor breeds in mountainous regions from southern Russia (Altai eastward to the mountains east of Lake Baikal) and northwestern Mongolia southward to the Tien Shan, Pamir, and northeastern Afghanistan. Outside the breeding season, it can be found in the Himalayas, with records extending eastward at least to Bhutan.

=== Breeding ===
It breeds on sparsely vegetated, rocky alpine meadows at elevations ranging from 2800 to 5000 meters. During the breeding season (May to August), it primarily feeds on invertebrates, supplementing its diet with berries in winter. It likely produces two broods annually.

== Status ==
This species is evaluated as "Least Concern" by the IUCN Red List, due to its extensive range, stable population trend, and a population size not believed to approach threatened levels

== Gallery ==
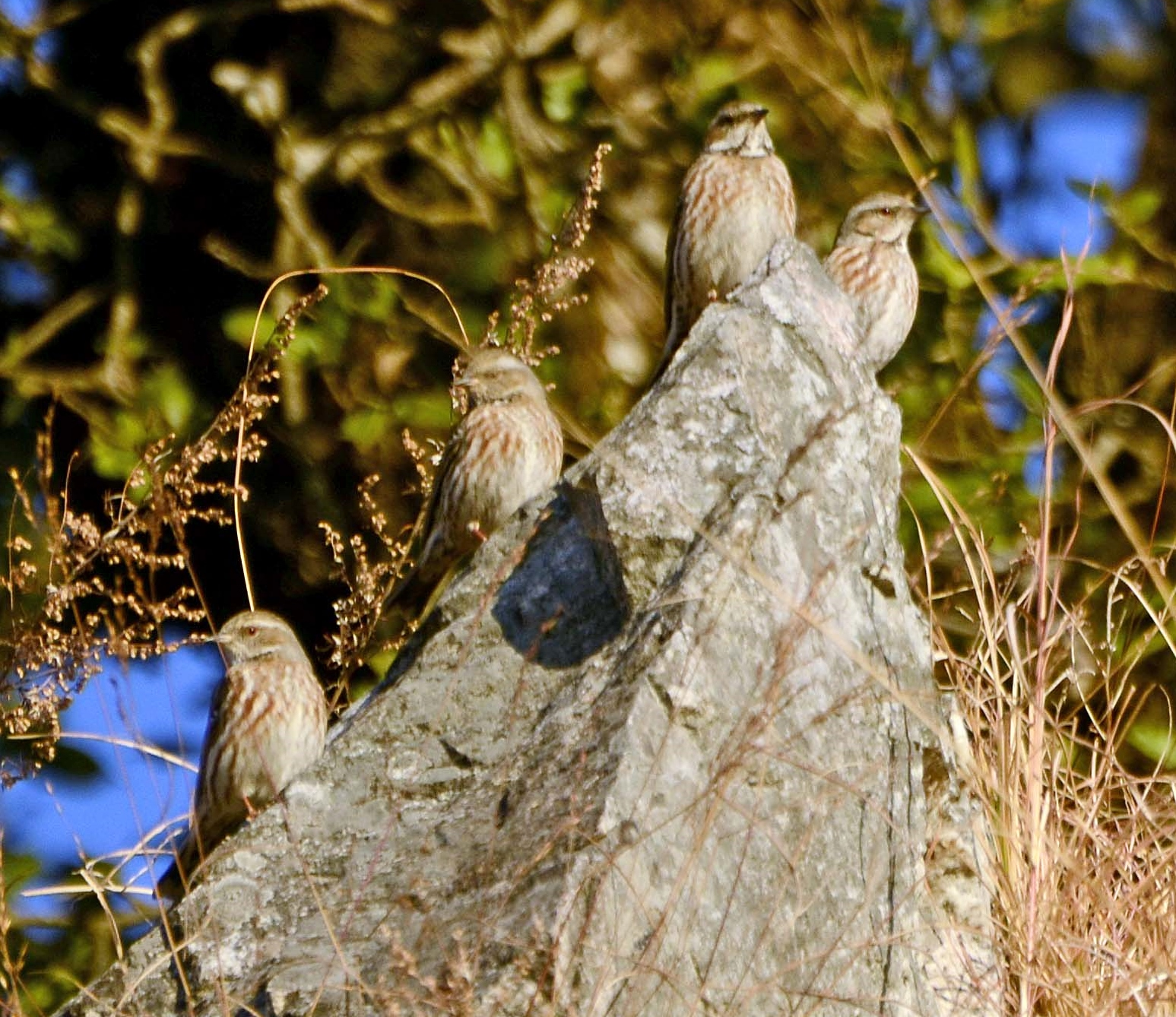
Altai accentor in Pangot

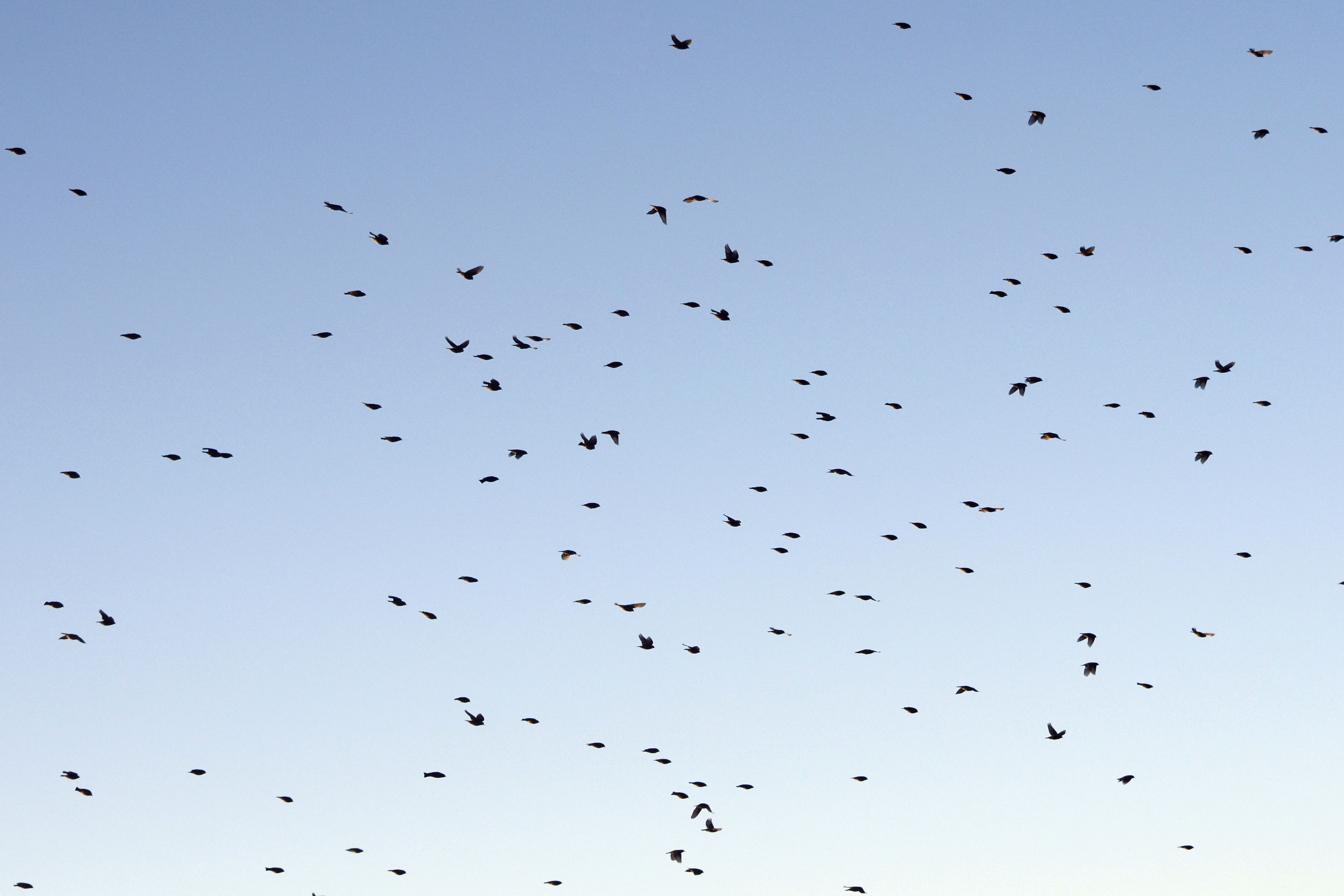
Flock of Altai accentor in flight. From Pangot, Uttarakhand, India

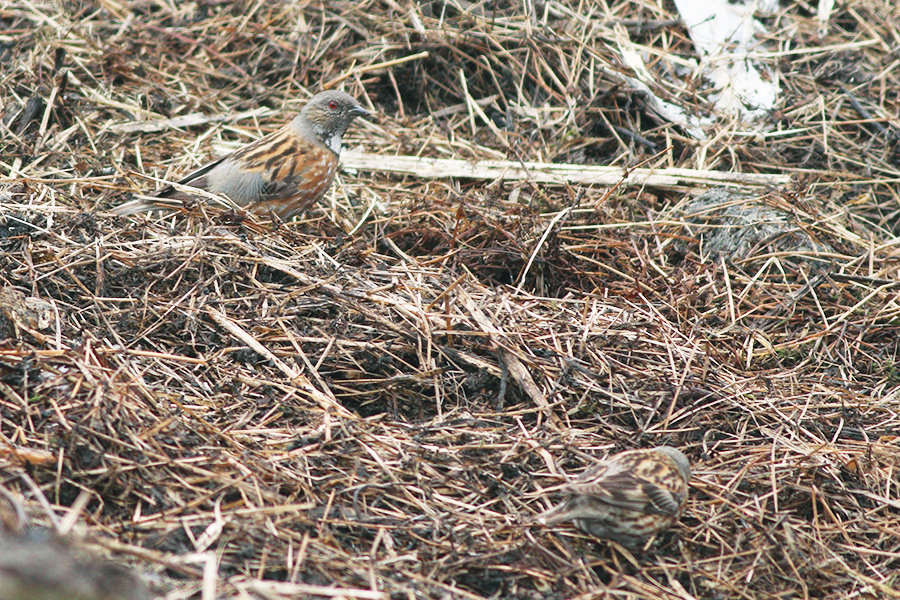
highly camouflaged when on ground at Gnathang Valley, Sikkim, India

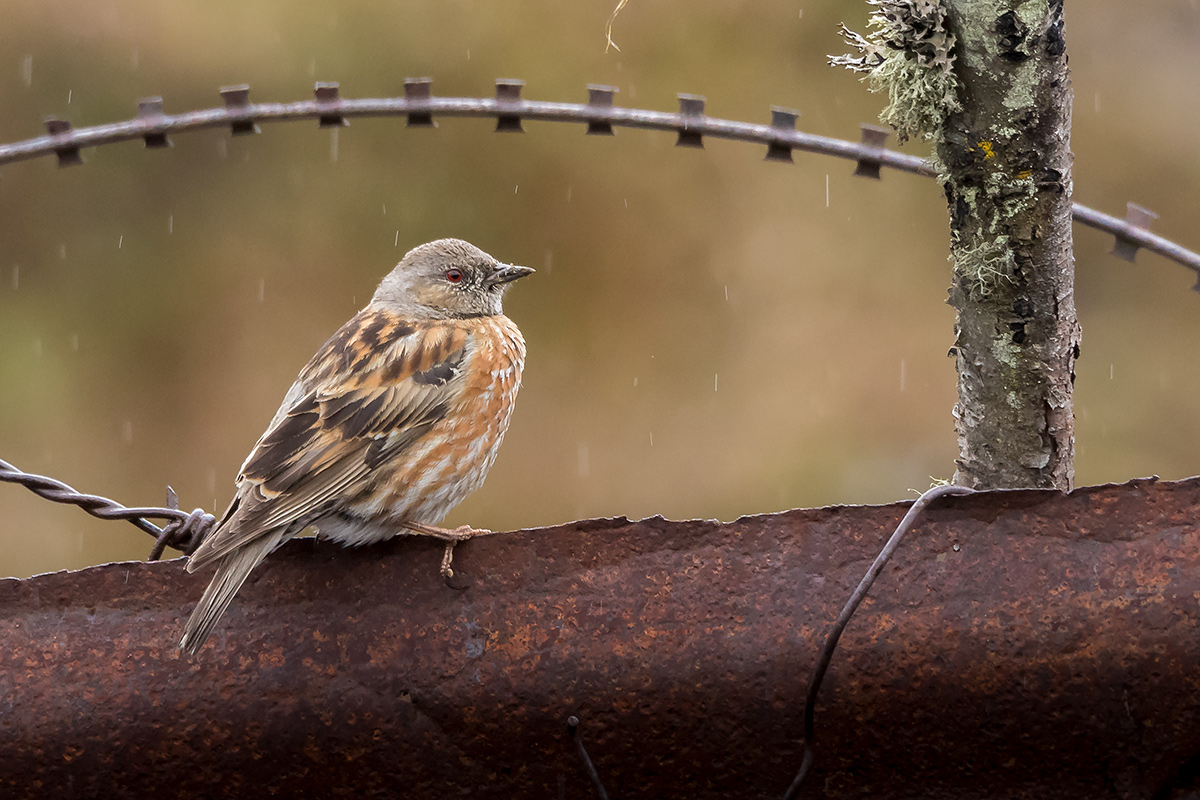
Taken at Gnathang, Sikkim, India

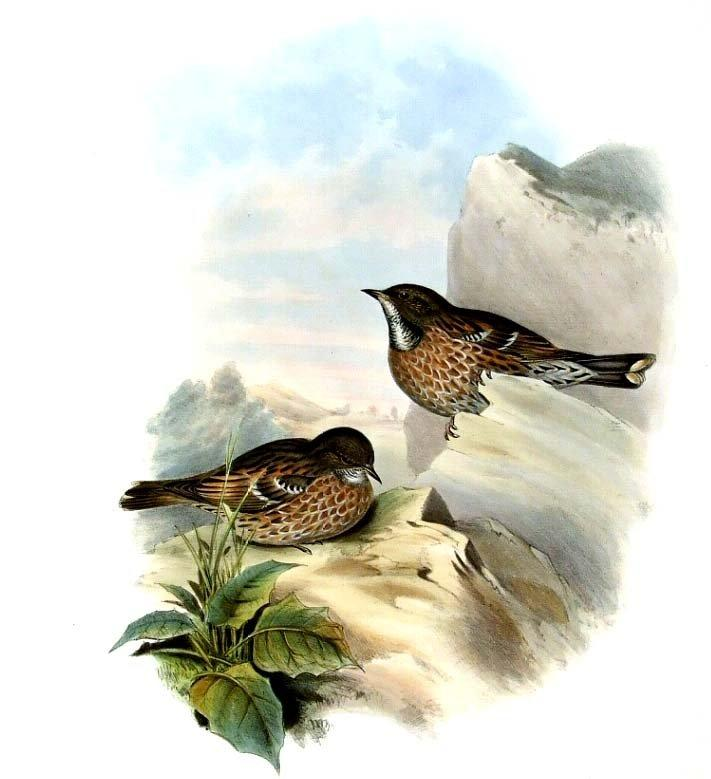
Painting by John Gould
