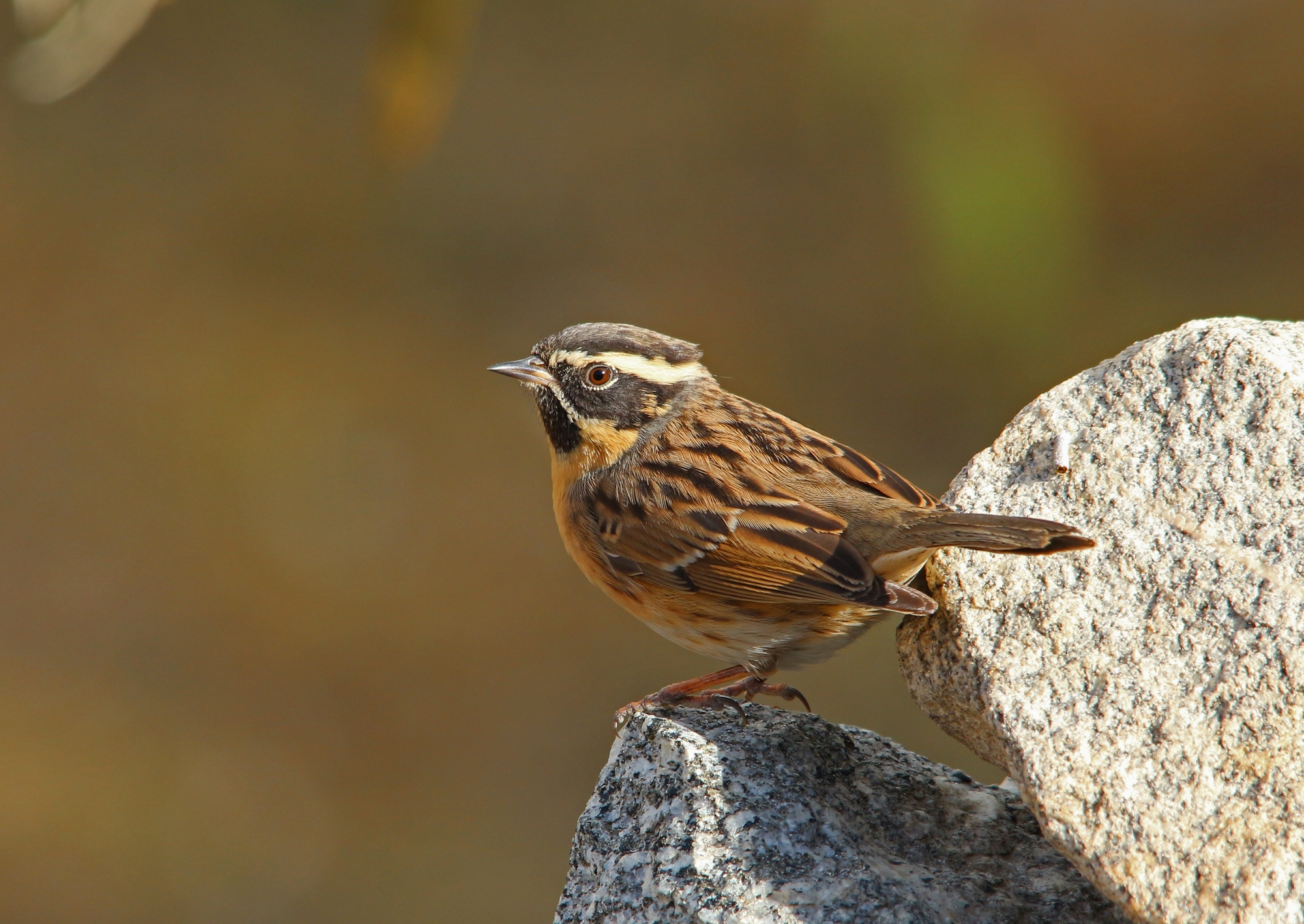
- Black-throated Accentor, Pakistan

Conservation status
- Least Concern (IUCN 3.1)

Scientific classification
- Kingdom: Animalia
- Phylum: Chordata
- Class: Aves
- Order: Passeriformes
- Family: Prunellidae
- Genus: Prunella
- Species: P. atrogularis

Binomial name
- Prunella atrogularis (Brandt, 1843)
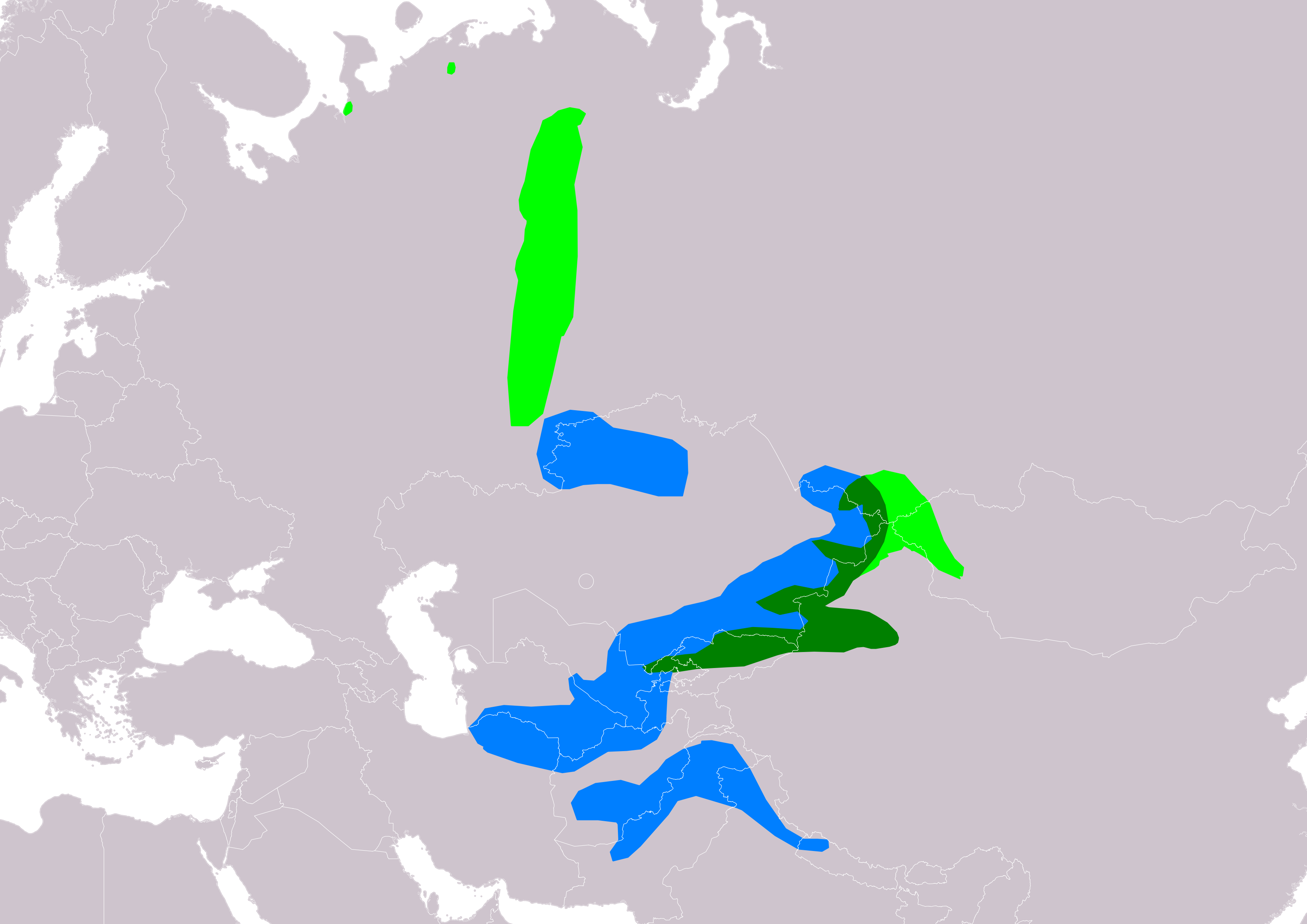
- Range of P. atrogularis (Compiled by: BirdLife International and Handbook of the Birds of the World (2016) 2016.) Breeding Resident Non-breeding

= Black-throated accentor =

Species of bird

The black-throated accentor (Prunella atrogularis) is a small passerine bird found in the Ural, Tian Shan and Altai Mountains. It is migratory, wintering in Afghanistan and neighboring countries. It is a rare vagrant in western Europe.

== Taxonomy and etymology ==
The genus name Prunella is from German Braunelle - "brown" in diminutive form. The specific atrogularis is from Latin, meaning "black-throated"; ater - "black" and gular - "throat".

There are two recognized subspecies:

- P. a. atrogularis - Breeds in the northern and central Ural Mountains of northwestern Russia. Winters in eastern Iran, Turkmenistan and Uzbekistan, south to Afghanistan and the southwestern Indian subcontinent .
- P. a. Huttoni - Breeds in Central Asia, from the Altai Mountains south to the Tien Shan and Pamir Mountains. In winter it migrate south, to southwest Asia. The name Huttoni commemorates the British captain and mamologist Thomas Hutton (1807–1874) who served in India and Afghanistan.

== Description ==
This is a dunnock-sized bird, 13.5–14 centimetres (5.3–5.5 in) in length. It has a streaked dark brown back, somewhat resembling a house sparrow, but adults have a black crown, face patch and throat, and a white supercilium. The breast is orange, and the belly white with orange stripes. Like other accentors, this species has an insectivore's fine pointed bill.

Sexes are similar, but winter birds and juveniles are less contrasted. In particular, the dark throat may be almost absent in young birds.

The call is a fine ti-ti-ti, and the song is similar to the dunnock's pleasant twittering.

== Ecology ==
The black-throated accentor builds a neat nest low in spruce thickets, laying 3-5 unspotted blue eggs. It winters in scrub or cultivation.

== Status ==
This species is evaluated as "Least Concern" by the IUCN Red List, due to its extensive range, stable population trend, and a population size not believed to approach threatened levels.
