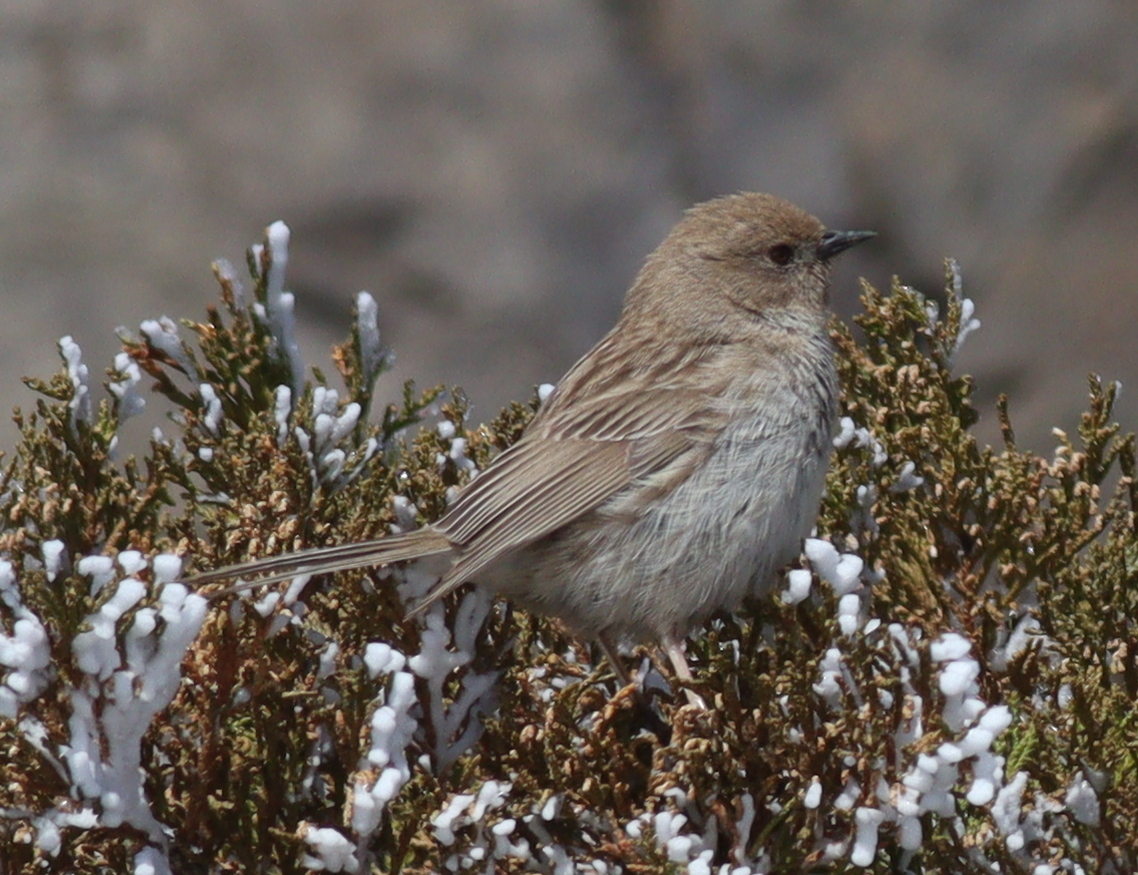

Conservation status
- Least Concern (IUCN 3.1)

Scientific classification
- Kingdom: Animalia
- Phylum: Chordata
- Class: Aves
- Order: Passeriformes
- Family: Prunellidae
- Genus: Prunella
- Species: P. koslowi

Binomial name
- Prunella koslowi (Przewalski, 1887)

= Kozlov's accentor =

Species of bird

Kozlov's accentor (Prunella koslowi) or the Mongolian accentor, is a species of bird in the family Prunellidae. It is found in Mongolia and northern China.

The specific epithet was chosen to honour the Russian explorer Pyotr Kozlov.

The name Tharrhaleus pallidus Menzbier, 1887 was published just months after the scientific name to which this species is now recognized: Accentor koslowi Przewalski; therefore, it is a synonym of it.
