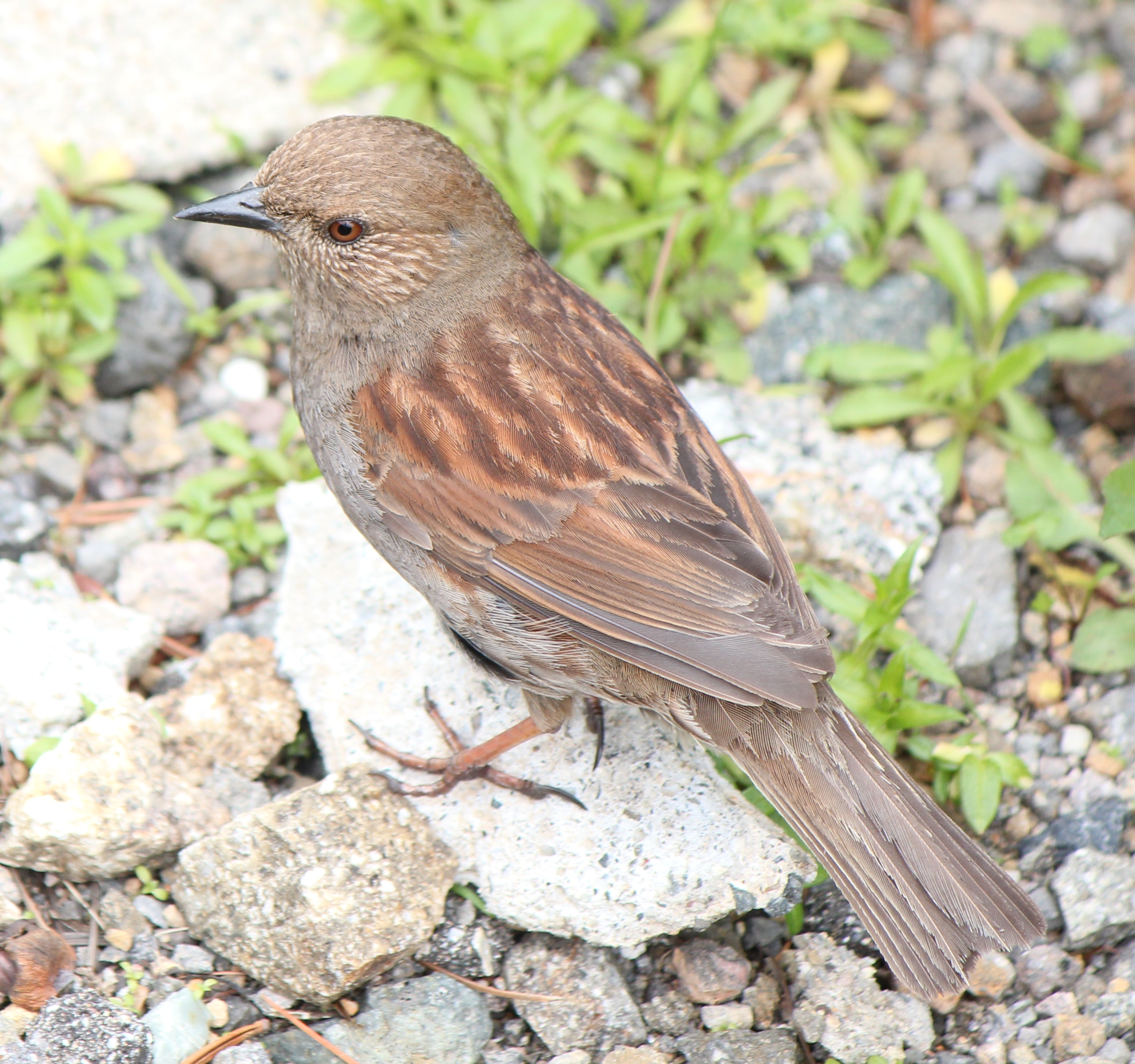
- in Mount Norikura

Conservation status
- Least Concern (IUCN 3.1)

Scientific classification
- Kingdom: Animalia
- Phylum: Chordata
- Class: Aves
- Order: Passeriformes
- Family: Prunellidae
- Genus: Prunella
- Species: P. rubida

Binomial name
- Prunella rubida (Temminck & Schlegel, 1847)

= Japanese accentor =

Species of bird

The Japanese accentor (Prunella rubida) is a species of bird in the family Prunellidae. It is found in Japan and Sakhalin.

Its natural habitat is temperate forest.
