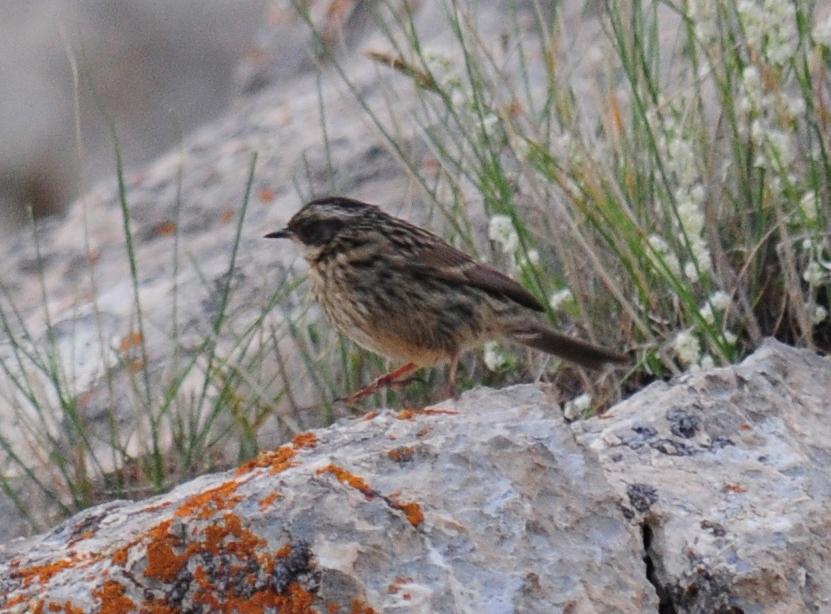

Conservation status
- Least Concern (IUCN 3.1)

Scientific classification
- Kingdom: Animalia
- Phylum: Chordata
- Class: Aves
- Order: Passeriformes
- Family: Prunellidae
- Genus: Prunella
- Species: P. ocularis

Binomial name
- Prunella ocularis (Radde, 1884)

Synonyms
- Accentor ocularis Prunella fagani

= Radde's accentor =

Species of bird

Radde's accentor (Prunella ocularis) is a species of bird in the family Prunellidae. It is found in mountainous parts of Yemen and northern Southwest Asia.

Its natural habitat is temperate grassland.

== Taxonomy ==
Radde's accentor was described by the German naturalist Gustav Radde in 1884 from a specimen collected in the Talysh Mountains near the Azerbaijan-Iran border. He coined the binomial name Accentor ocularis. It is now placed in the genus Prunella that was introduced by the French ornithologist Louis Pierre Vieillot in 1816.

There are two subspecies:

- P. o. ocularis (Radde, 1884) - native to montane Turkey through Turkmenistan, Iran and Afghanistan
- P. o. fagani (Ogilvie-Grant, 1913) - native to far western Yemen. Formerly considered a separate species, Arabian accentor (Prunella fagani)
