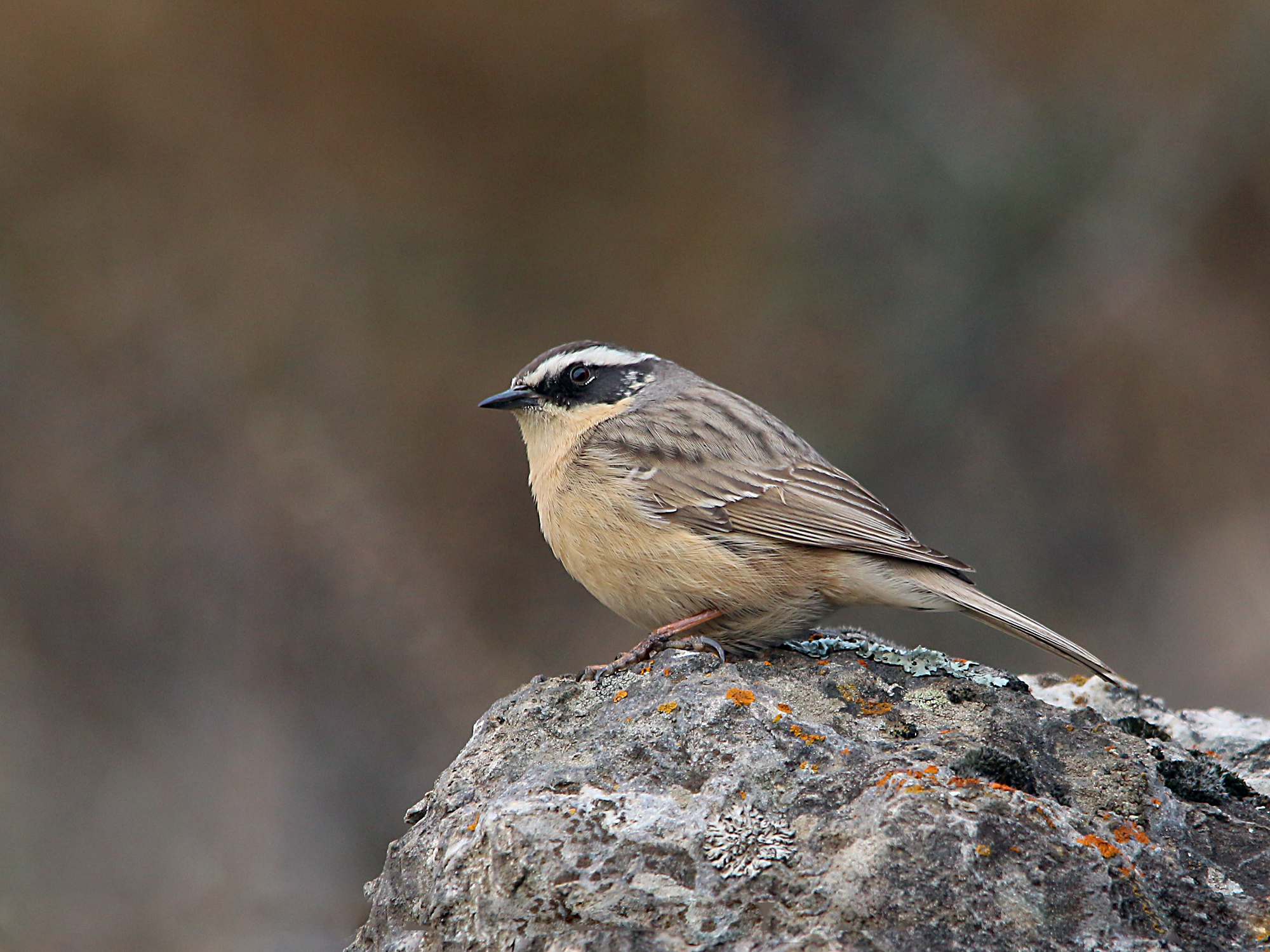
- Brown Accentor, Pakistan

Conservation status
- Least Concern (IUCN 3.1)

Scientific classification
- Kingdom: Animalia
- Phylum: Chordata
- Class: Aves
- Order: Passeriformes
- Family: Prunellidae
- Genus: Prunella
- Species: P. fulvescens

Binomial name
- Prunella fulvescens (Severtsov, 1873)

= Brown accentor =

Species of bird

The brown accentor (Prunella fulvescens) is a species of bird in the family Prunellidae. It is found in Afghanistan, China, India, Kazakhstan, Mongolia, Nepal, Pakistan, Russia, Tajikistan, Turkmenistan, and Uzbekistan.

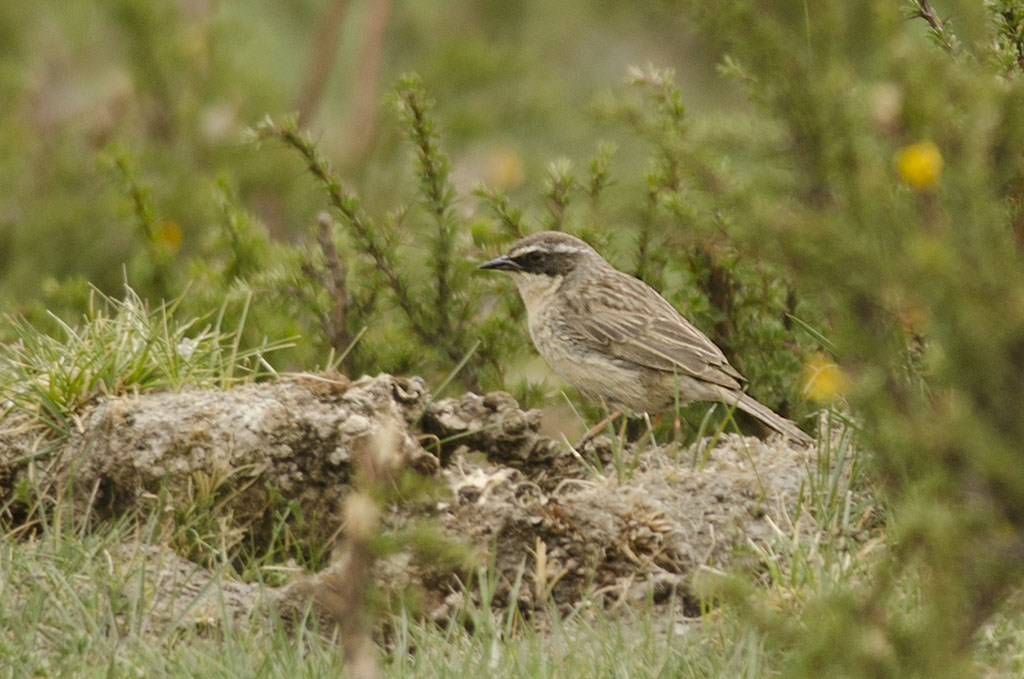
Brown Accentor at Upper Sumdo, Ladakh, India

Their natural habitat is Mediterranean-type shrubby vegetation. They breed between 3,300 and 5,100 meters of altitude. They prefer drier habitats than other accentors.

== Description ==
They can be identified by their white supercilium (broader behind the eye), blackish-brown mask, blackish-brown ear-coverts, yellowish breast, and yellowish belly. Males are larger than females.

== Mating and Breeding ==
Brown accentors are mostly monogamous, but polyandry has also been recorded. They are territorial during the breeding season, which begins in late May. The females lay clutches of 3-4 eggs from late June to late July, which they incubate for 12-14 days. Then, males and females feed nestlings for 13-15 days, with females performing the majority of the feeding.

== Diet ==
Adults eat seeds, fruits, and insects. Nestlings have only been observed eating insects.

== Status ==
This species is classified as Least Concern due to its extensive range, stable population trend, and a population size that is not believed to approach threatened levels.

The global population size has not been quantified, but the species is reported to be common in Central Asia, locally common in winter in Pakistan, locally common in northern India, and common in north-western Nepal.
