= Carl Ludwig Hablitz =

Russian botanist

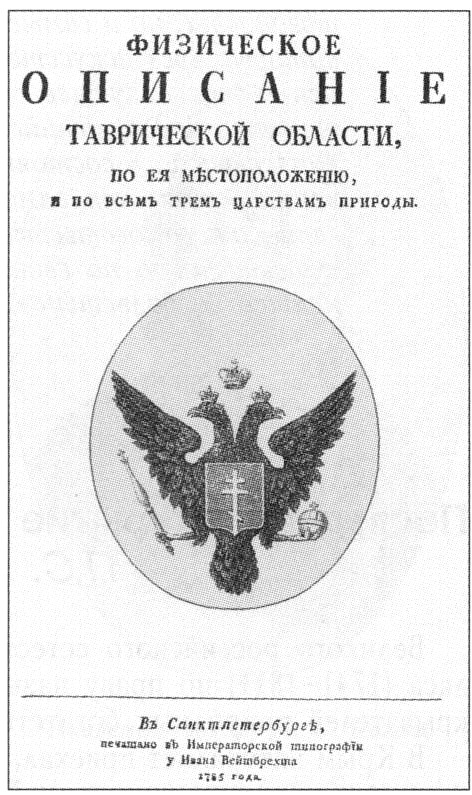
Carl Ludwig Hablitz, Physical description of Taurid area, its position and three empires of nature, 1785. cover

Carl Ludwig von Hablitz (2 April 1752 – 9 October 1821), also known as Karl Ivanovich Gablits (Russian: Карл Ива́нович Га́блиц), was a Prussian-born Russian botanist.

== Biography ==
Hablitz was born in Königsberg, in 1758 his father was invited to work on the University of Moscow. Carl arrived at Russia at the age of 6 years. He studied to be a scientific botanist and later taught at the University of Moscow for many years. He was a member of the Imperial Russian Academy of Sciences.

In 1783 he was the author of a chapter in German: Bemerkungen in der persischen Landschaft Gilan und auf den Gilanischen Gebirgen. His name is given as Carl Hablizl.

He was the author of Physical description of Taurid area, its position and three empires of nature (1785).

Hablitz died in St. Petersburg.

He was the maternal grandfather of the Russian composer Alexander Serov and great-grandfather of the Russian painter Valentin Serov.
