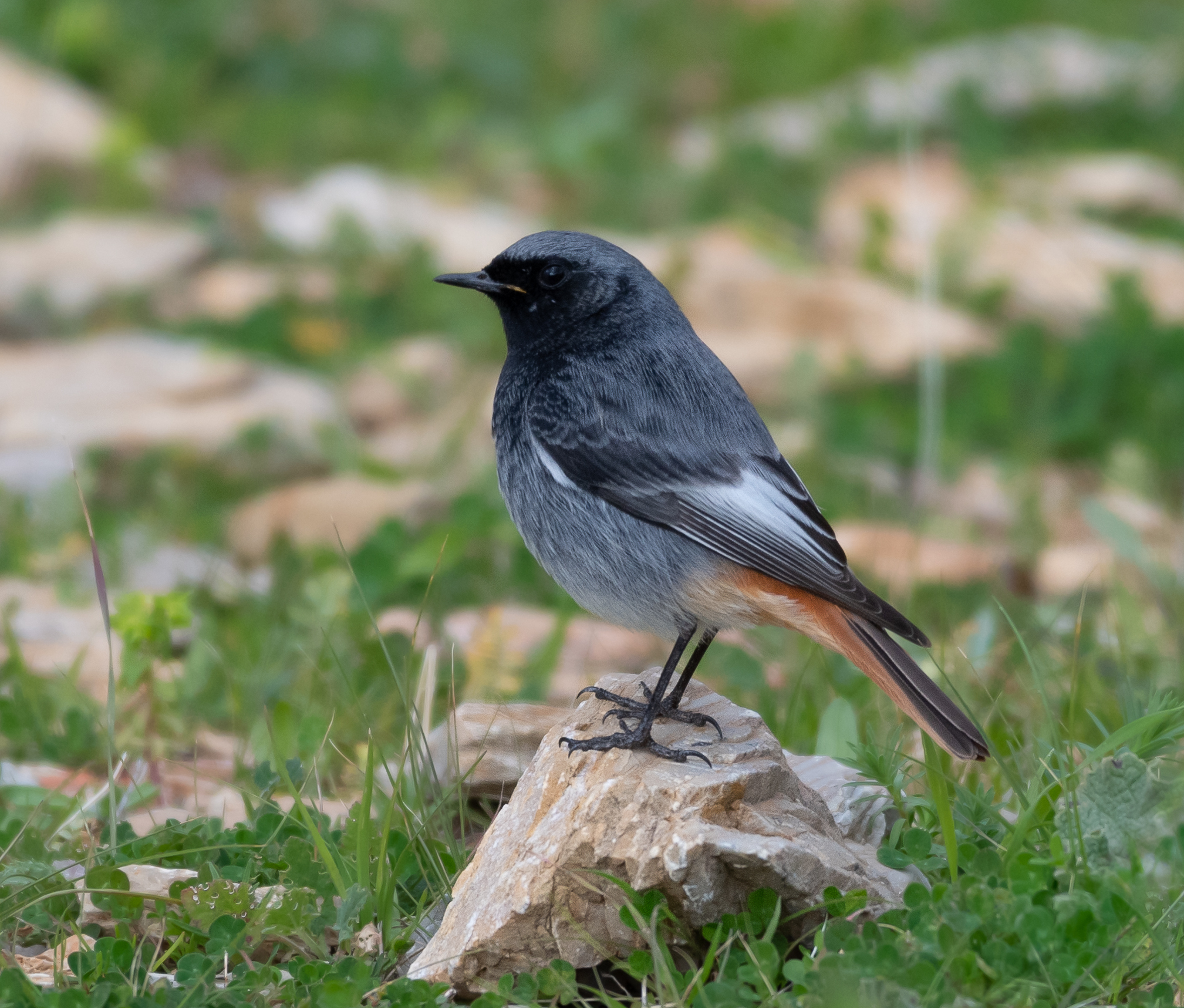
- Male P. o. gibraltariensis in Tunisia
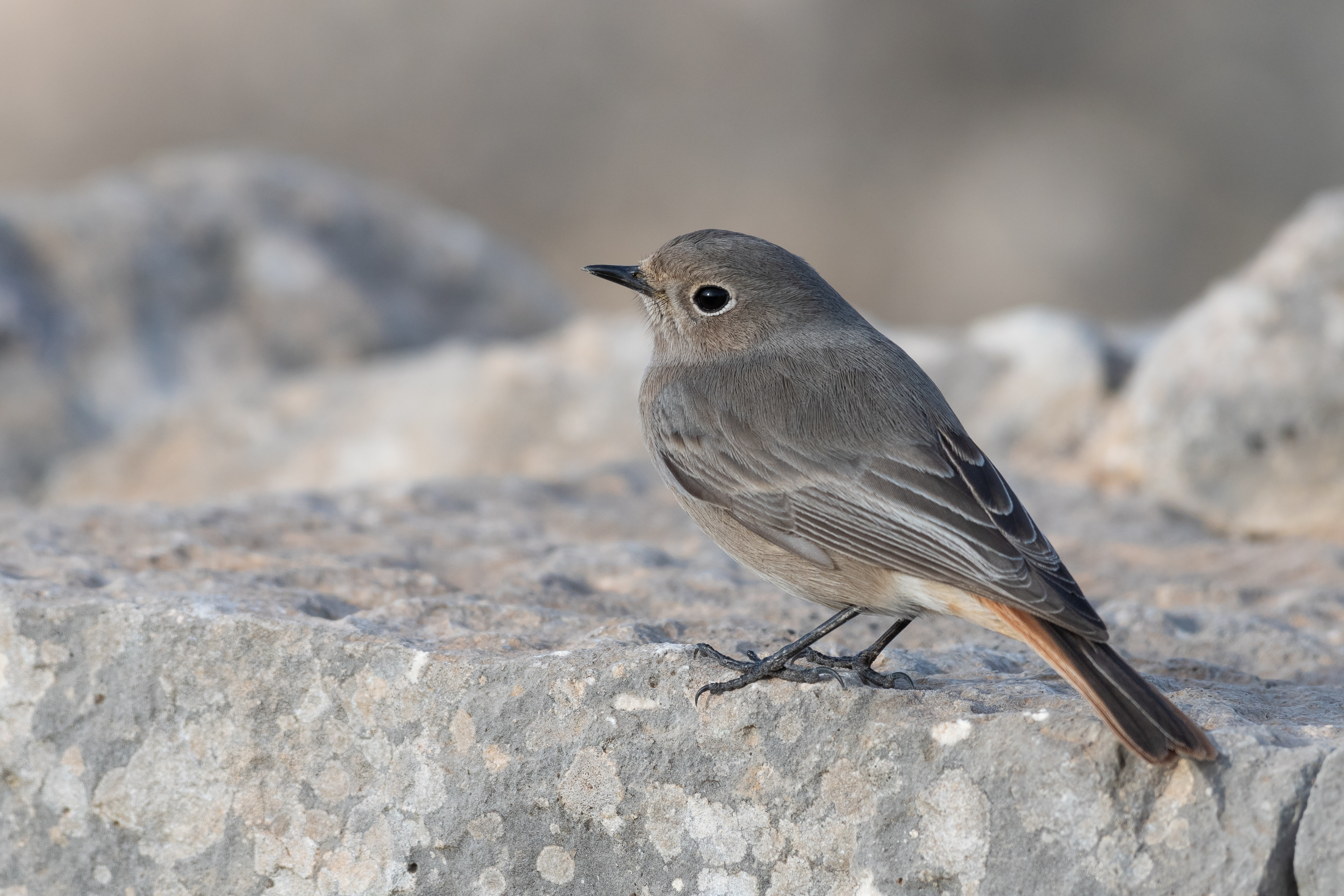
- Female P. o. gibraltariensis in Tunisia

Conservation status
- Least Concern (IUCN 3.1)

Scientific classification
- Kingdom: Animalia
- Phylum: Chordata
- Class: Aves
- Order: Passeriformes
- Family: Muscicapidae
- Genus: Phoenicurus
- Species: P. ochruros

Binomial name
- Phoenicurus ochruros (Gmelin, SG, 1774)

Subspecies
- 5–7, see text
- Breeding Resident Passage Non-breeding Compiled by: BirdLife International and Handbook of the Birds of the World (2019) 2018.

Synonyms
- Ruticilla titys (Scop.)

= Black redstart =

Species of bird

The black redstart (Phoenicurus ochruros) is a small passerine bird in the Old World flycatcher family. It is a widespread breeder in rocky habitats across Eurasia and North Africa, from the British Isles south to Morocco and east to central China. It is resident in the milder parts of its range, but northern and eastern birds migrate.

== Taxonomy and systematics ==
The first formal description of the black redstart was by the German naturalist Samuel Gottlieb Gmelin in 1774 under the binomial name Mottacilla ochruros. The species is now placed in the genus Phoenicurus that was introduced in 1817 by the English naturalist Thomas Forster. Both parts of the scientific name are from Ancient Greek and refer to the colour of the tail. The genus name Phoenicurus is from phoinix, "red", and -ouros -"tailed", and the specific ochruros is from okhros, "pale yellow" and -ouros. Obsolete common names include Tithys redstart, blackstart (not to be confused with the species currently known as blackstart) and black redtail.

The black redstart is a member of a temperate Eurasian clade, which also includes the Daurian redstart, Hodgson's redstart, the white-winged redstart and perhaps Przevalski's redstart. The ancestors of the present species diverged from about 3 million years ago (mya) (Late Pliocene) onwards and spread throughout much of Palearctic from 1.5 mya onward. It is not very closely related to the common redstart. As these are separated by different behaviour and ecological requirements and have not evolved fertilisation barriers, the two European species can produce apparently fertile and viable hybrids.

There are a number of subspecies, which differ mainly in the underpart colours of the adult males and, for some forms, calls; different authorities accept between five and seven subspecies. They can be separated into three major groups, according to morphology, biogeography and mtDNA cytochrome b sequence data.

P. o. phoenicuroides group. Basal central and eastern Asian forms which diverged from the ancestral stock as the species slowly spread west (c. 3–1.5 mya). Females and juveniles light grey brown.

- Phoenicurus ochruros phoenicuroides (Moore, F, 1854) – Tian Shan eastwards to Mongolia. Small; adult males have lower breast, belly and flanks deep rufous, pale wing-patch absent, sometimes white forehead. Overall quite similar to a much darker common redstart with black chest. Females and juveniles are similar to common redstart but have an overall sandier, paler colour and often a distinct buff eye-ring.
- Phoenicurus ochruros murinus Fedorenko, 2018 – Altai, Tuva, northern China and western Mongolia. Distinguished from the previous Turkestan subspecies by the absence of any contrast in the colour of the head, nape and back, all of which are concolorous dark grey.
- Phoenicurus ochruros rufiventris (Vieillot, 1818) – Turkmenistan eastwards through Pamir and Alay Mountains to Himalaya. Usually large; adult males like P. o. phoenicuroides, but darker overall, with black back and rufous-chestnut underside. Females with rufous tinge to underside. Exact limits with P. o. phoenicuroides unresolved.
  - Phoenicurus ochruros xerophilus. China east of and between ranges of preceding two. Large; colour pattern like P. o. phoenicuroides but paler. Included in P. o. rufiventris by many authorities.

P. o. ochruros group. Western Asian forms, whose lineage separated from the gibraltariensis group c. 1.5–0.5 mya. Females and juveniles intermediate.

- Phoenicurus ochruros ochruros (Gmelin, SG, 1774) – Eastern Turkey, Alborz, and Caucasus. Small, somewhat intermediate between P. o. phoenicuroides and P. o. gibraltariensis. Generally like latter, but rufous underside, pale wing patch weakly developed.
- Phoenicurus ochruros semirufus (Hemprich & Ehrenberg, 1833) – Levant. Small; adult males somewhat similar to rufiventris except in size. Black areas extensive.

P. o. gibraltariensis group. European population, which formed as a distinct subspecies probably during the last ice age. Females and juveniles dark grey.

- Phoenicurus ochruros gibraltariensis (Gmelin, JF, 1789) – Western Europe east to the Crimea and western Turkey. Neck, upper back and shoulders dark slate grey to black in adult males, lighter than face and neck, pale wing patch strongly developed.
  - Phoenicurus ochruros aterrimus. Iberia and Morocco. Neck, upper back and shoulders black in adult males. Wide intergradation with P. o. gibraltariensis and treated as a synonym of it by many authorities.

== Description ==
The black redstart is 13–14.5 cm (5.1–5.7 in) in length and 12–20 g (0.42–0.71 oz) in weight, similar to the common redstart. The adult male is overall dark grey to black on the upperparts and with a black breast; the lower rump and tail are orange-red, with the two central tail feathers dark red-brown. The belly and undertail are either blackish-grey (western subspecies; see Taxonomy and systematics, above) or orange-red (eastern subspecies); the wings are blackish-grey with pale fringes on the secondaries forming a whitish panel (western subspecies) or all blackish (eastern subspecies). The female is grey (western subspecies) to grey-brown (eastern subspecies) overall except for the orange-red lower rump and tail, greyer than the common redstart; at any age the grey axillaries and underwing coverts are also distinctive (in the Common Redstart these are buff to orange-red). There are two distinct forms in first calendar year males at least in western subspecies, with the first ('carei') being similar to females and the second ('paradoxus') approaching adult males but lacking the whitish wing panel that does only develop during post-breeding moult of wing feathers in the second calendar year. This second form is much rarer than the first.

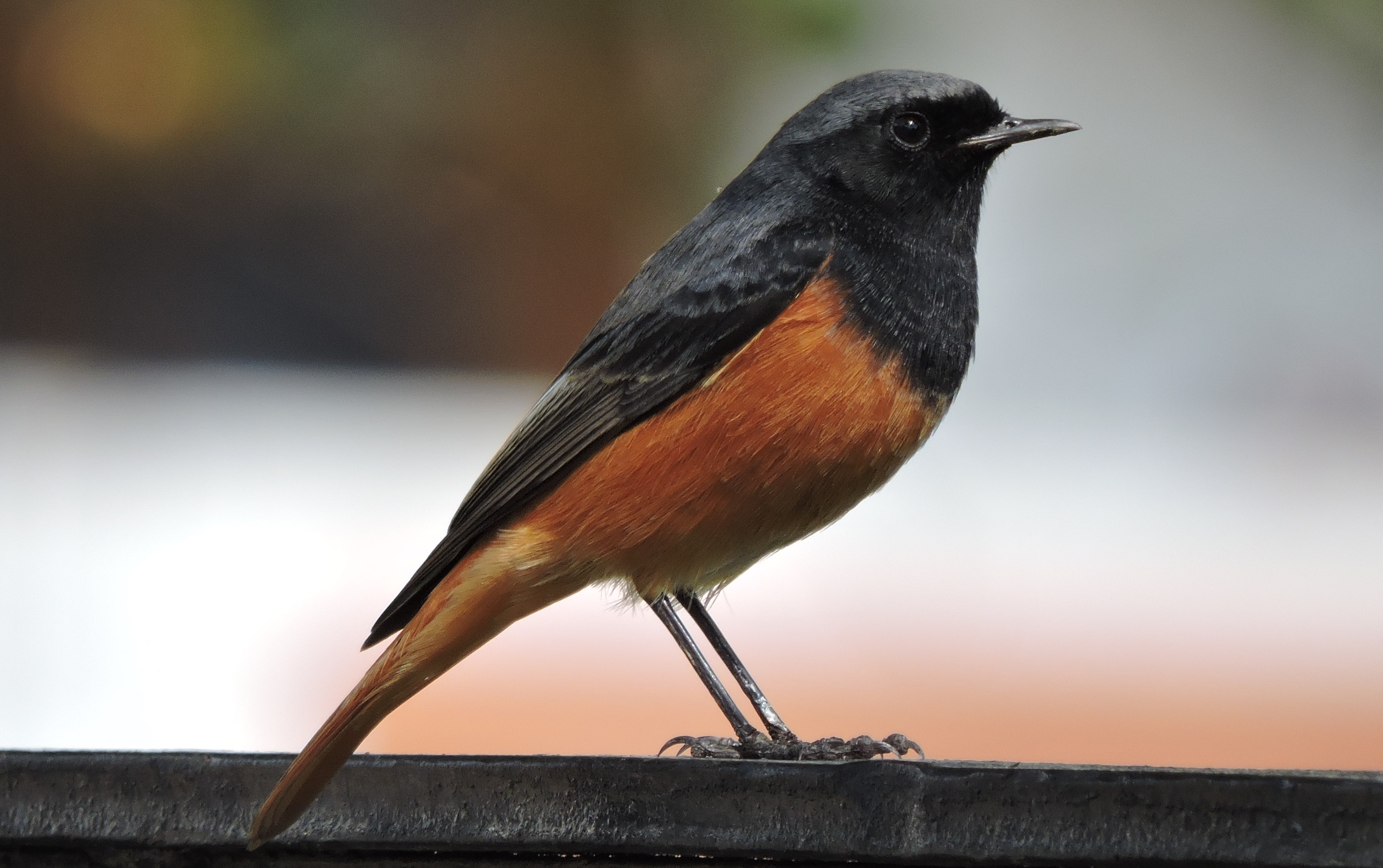
Black redstart, Sector 38 West, Chandigarh, India

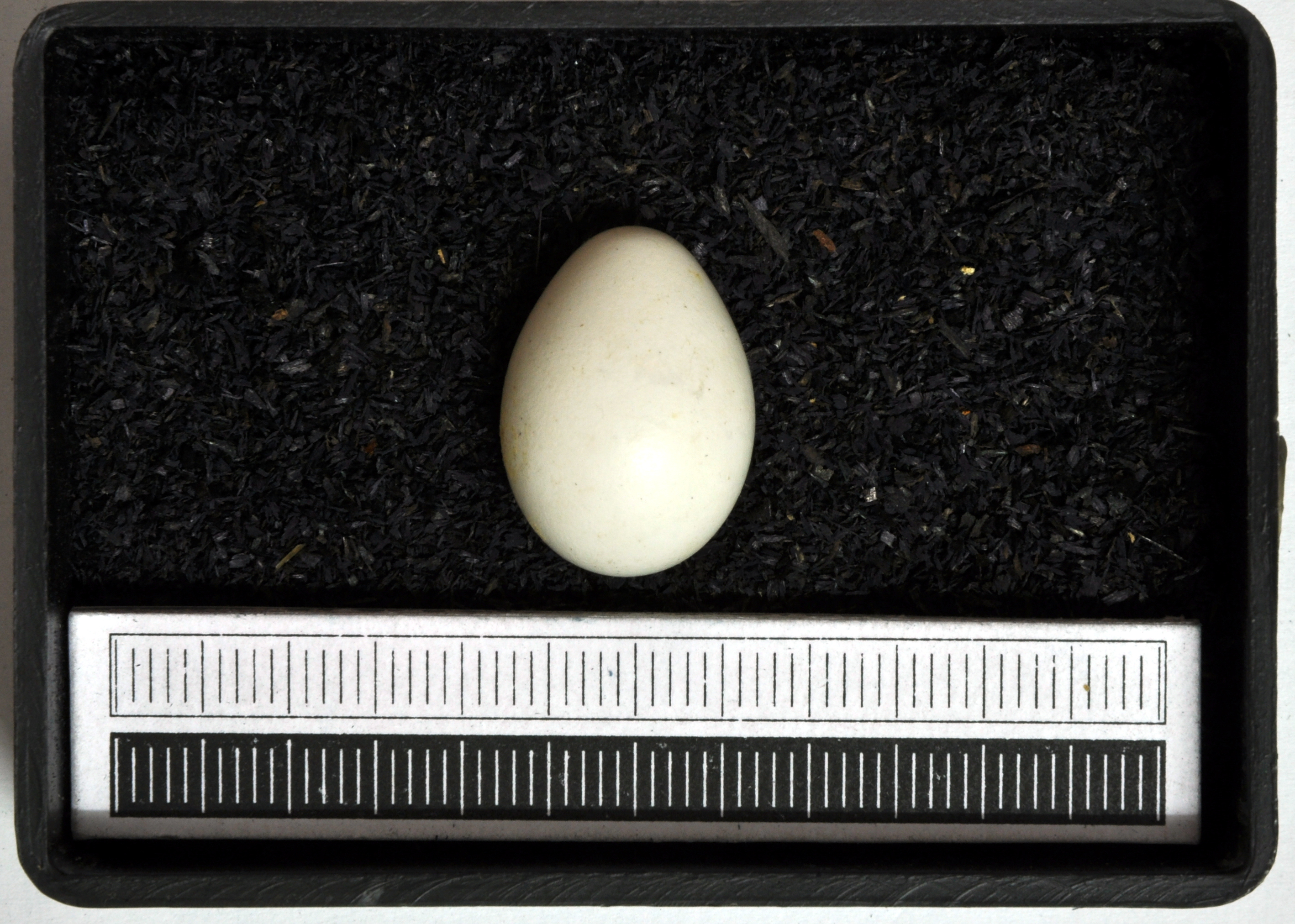
Egg, collection Museum Wiesbaden

== Distribution and habitat ==
It is a widespread breeder in south and central Europe and Asia and north-west Africa, from Great Britain and Ireland (where local) south to Morocco, east to central China. It is resident in the milder parts of its range, but north-eastern birds migrate to winter in southern and western Europe and Asia, and north Africa. It nests in crevices or holes in buildings.

In Britain, it is most common as a passage and winter visitor, with only 20–50 pairs breeding. On passage it is fairly common on the east and south coasts, and in winter on the coasts of Wales and western and southern England, with a few also at inland sites. Migrant black redstarts arrive in Britain in October or November and either move on or remain to winter, returning eastward in March or April. They also winter on the south and east coasts of Ireland.

The species originally inhabited stony ground in mountains, particularly cliffs, but since about 1900 has expanded to include similar urban habitats including bombed areas during and after World War II, and large industrial complexes that have the bare areas and cliff-like buildings it favours; in Great Britain, most of the small breeding population nests in such industrial areas. It will catch passing insects in flight, and migrants often hunt in coastal tide-wrack for flies or tiny crustaceans. Its quick ducks of head and body are robin-like, and its tail is often flicked. The male has a rattling song and a tick call.

Eastern race birds are very rare vagrants in western Europe.

== Behaviour and ecology ==
=== Breeding ===
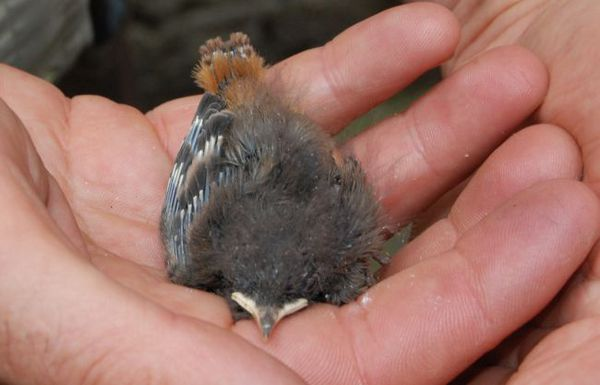
A black redstart pullus, "in pin", in the hands of a licensed bird ringer

Black redstarts are usually monogamous. In Central Europe, egg-laying normally begins in the second half of April, although earlier breeding has been recorded. The breeding season varies across the species' range: in Morocco, it runs from late April to June. At a study site on the Tibetan Plateau, at an elevation of 4,300 m, egg-laying was recorded from early May to early July.

The nest is built by the female and is typically placed in a crevice or hole in rock or a wall or on a ledge of a building. The nest consists of a loose cup of grass and stems and is lined with hair, wool and feathers. The eggs are laid daily. The clutch consists of 4 to 6 eggs that are usually white but can also be pale blue. On average they measure 19.4 mm × 14.4 mm (0.76 in × 0.57 in) and weigh 2.16 g (0.076 oz). Beginning after the final egg is laid, the eggs are incubated by the female for 13–17 days. The young are cared for and fed by both parents and fledge after 12–19 days.

== Gallery ==
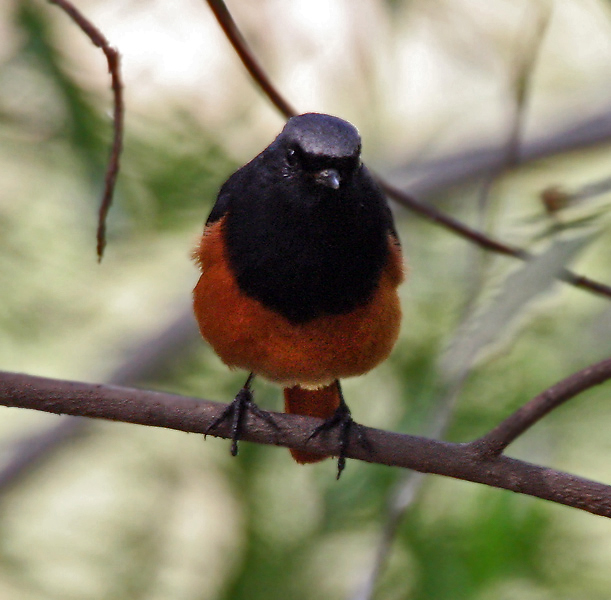
Male P. o. rufiventris at Sultanpur National Park in Gurgaon district of Haryana, India

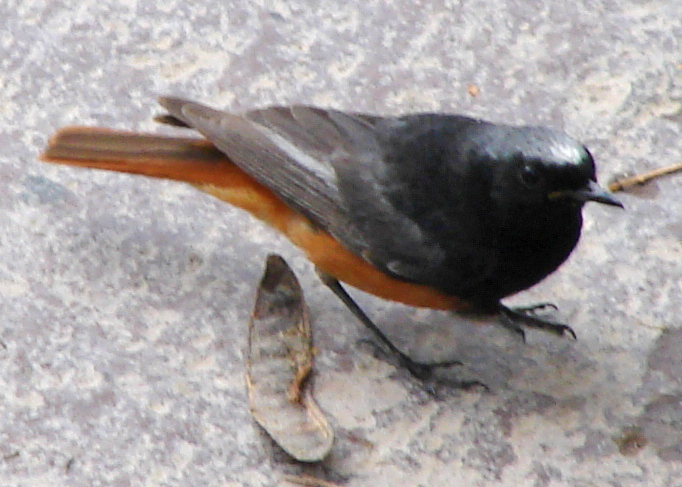
Caucasian black redstart (P. o. ochruros)

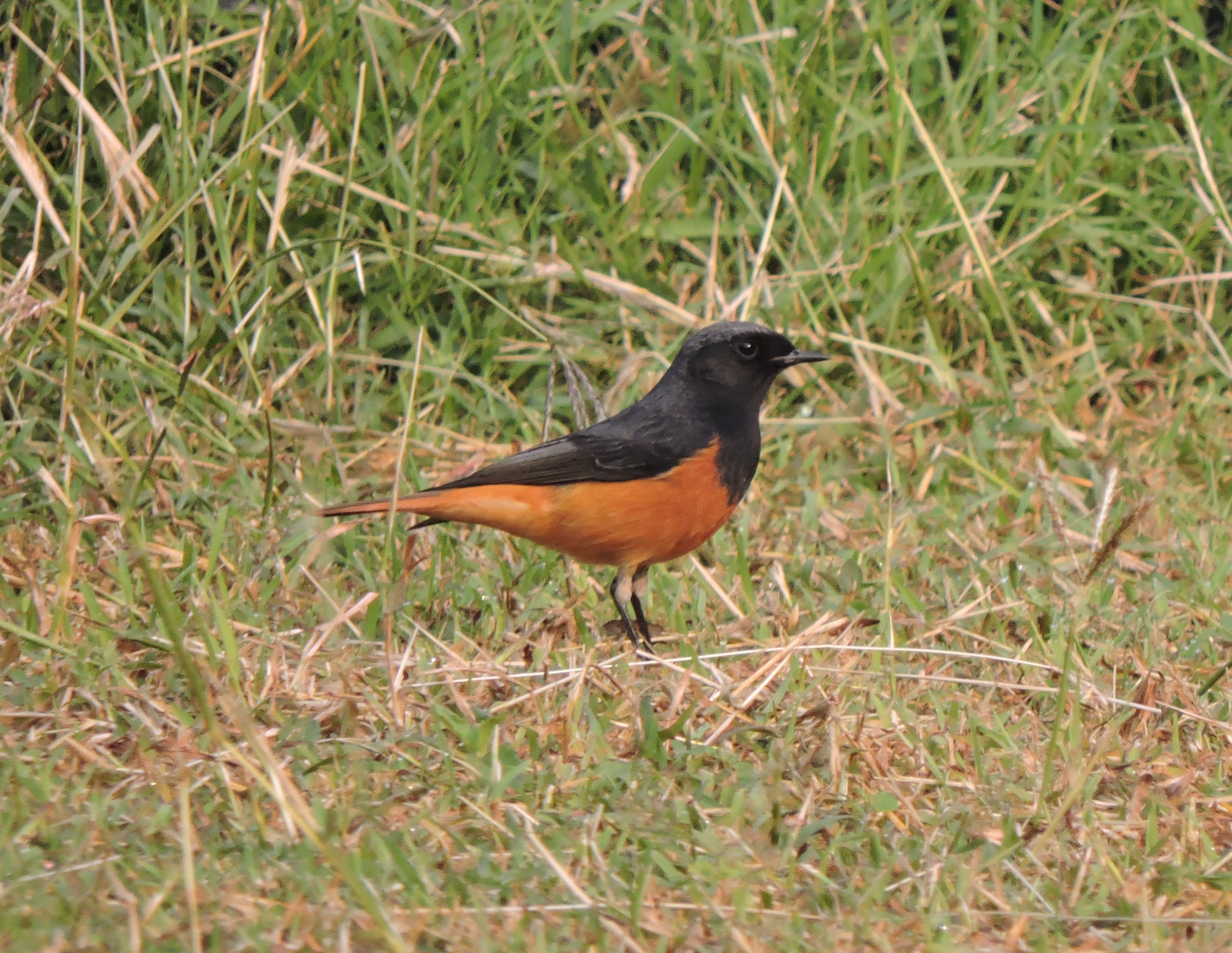
Black redstart, Phase 7, Mohali, Punjab, India

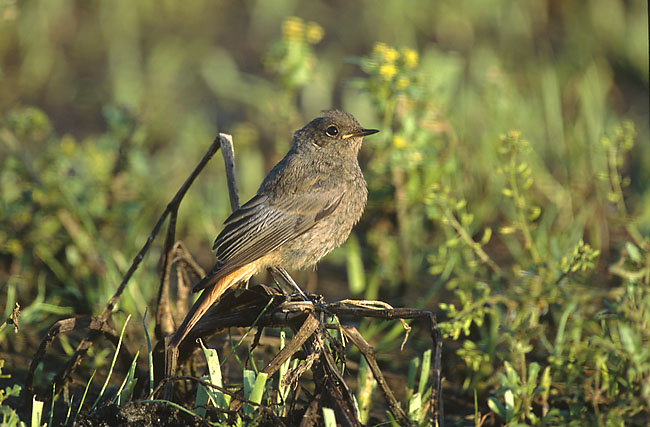
Immature European black redstart

== Sources ==
- Cramp, Stanley, ed. (1988). "Phoenicurus ochruros Black Redstart". Handbook of the Birds of Europe the Middle East and North Africa. The Birds of the Western Palearctic. Vol. V: Tyrant Flycatchers to Thrushes. Oxford: Oxford University Press. pp. 683–695. ISBN 978-0-19-857508-5.
