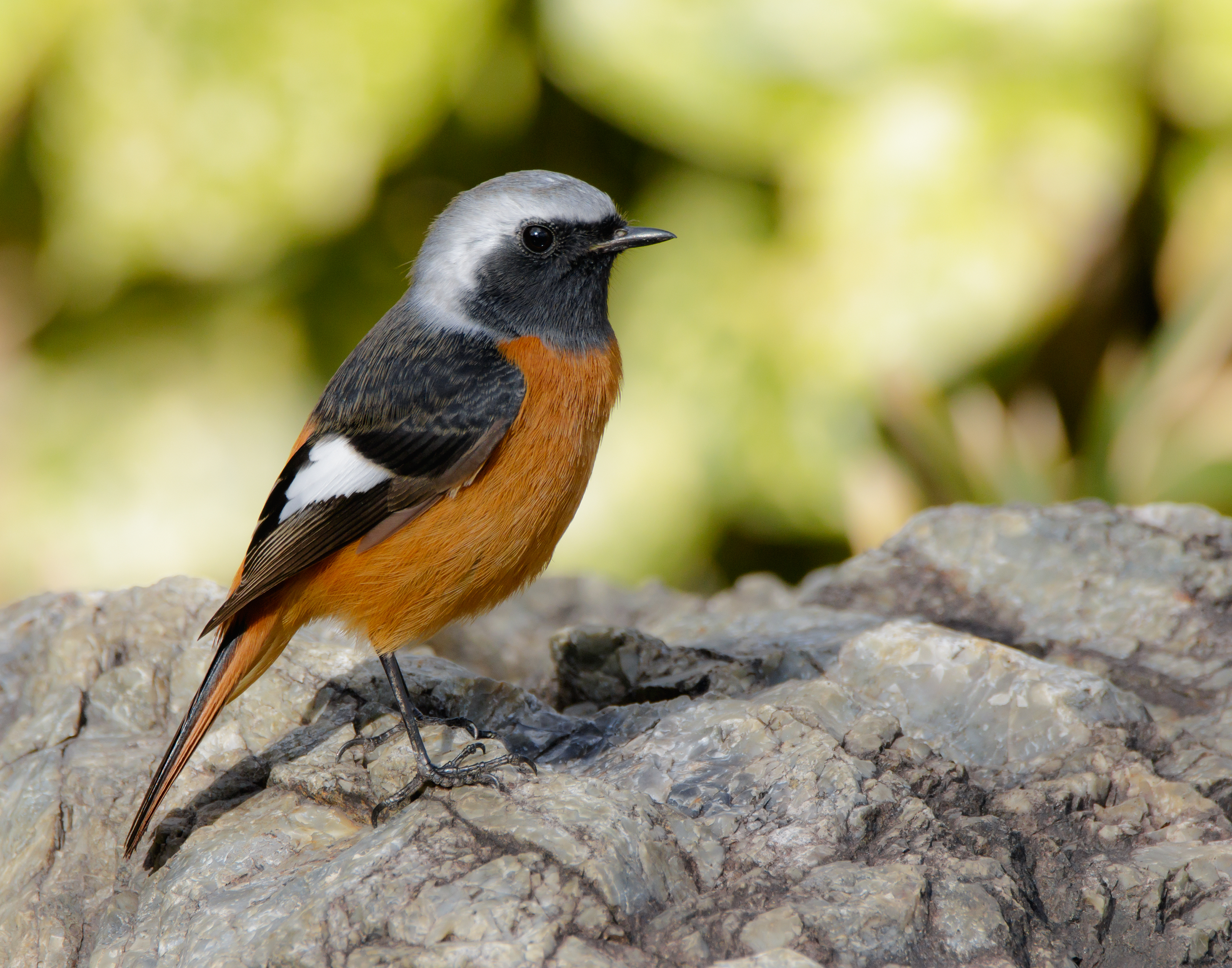
- Adult male

Conservation status
- Least Concern (IUCN 3.1)

Scientific classification
- Kingdom: Animalia
- Phylum: Chordata
- Class: Aves
- Order: Passeriformes
- Family: Muscicapidae
- Genus: Phoenicurus
- Species: P. auroreus

Binomial name
- Phoenicurus auroreus (Pallas, 1776)

= Daurian redstart =

Species of bird

The Daurian redstart (Phoenicurus auroreus) is a small passerine bird from temperate Asia. The species was first described by Peter Simon Pallas in 1776.

== Description and systematics ==
Its length is 14 to 15 cm and its weight is 11 to 20 g.

Like all typical redstarts, they are strongly sexually dimorphic. Breeding males have a grey crown and nape with lighter forehead and crown-sides, a black face and chin, brownish mantle and wings and a large white wing patch; the chest, lower back and rump are orange, and the tail is black with orange sides. Juvenile males are similarly patterned but much duller and less clearly marked.

Females are warm brown above, paler below, have an orange rump and tail sides, and have a large white wing patch similar to the males. Bill, eye, legs and feet are black in both sexes.

It was formerly classed as a member of the thrush family (Turdidae), but is now generally considered to be an Old World flycatcher (Muscicapidae). This species is divided into two subspecies, the eastern P. a. auroreus and the western P. a. leucopterus.

It belongs to a close-knit Eurasian clade which also includes the black redstart (P. ochruros), Hodgson's redstart (P. hodgsoni), the white-winged redstart (P. erythrogastrus) – which may be especially closely related to P. auroreus – and perhaps the Ala Shan redstart (P. alaschanicus). These all diverged during the latter part of the Late Pliocene and the earliest Early Pleistocene, some 3–1.5 million years ago, during onset of the Quaternary glaciation.

[[:File:딱새.ogg|]]
A song of daurian redstart

== Distribution and ecology ==
It is found in Manchuria, southeastern Russia, northeastern Mongolia, central China and Korea. It is migratory; P. a. auroreus winters in Korea, Japan, southeast coastal China and Taiwan, and P. a. leucopterus in northeast India and parts of Southeast Asia.

Daurian redstarts favour open forests, forest edges, agricultural margins, and are also commonly found in parks and urban gardens. They are reasonably confiding and often allow humans to approach quite closely before moving off. It breeds in the summer months, with a mated pair of the nominate subspecies having been encountered in early May. Daurian redstarts tend to choose mates with similar wing patch sizes to their own, though this does not seem to play a role in reproductive success.

Widespread and rather common, this bird is not considered a threatened species by the IUCN.

== Gallery ==
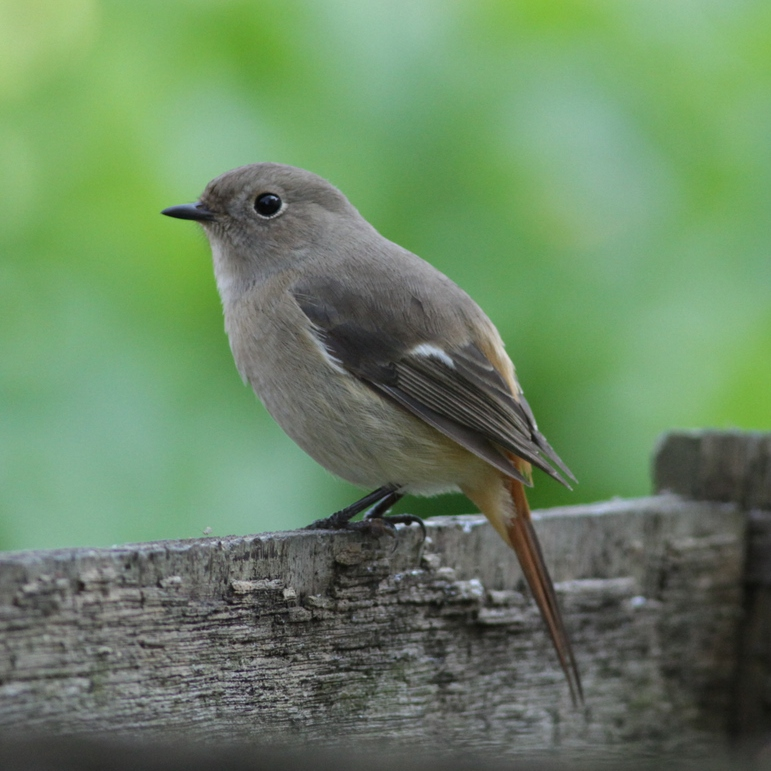
Female in Japan

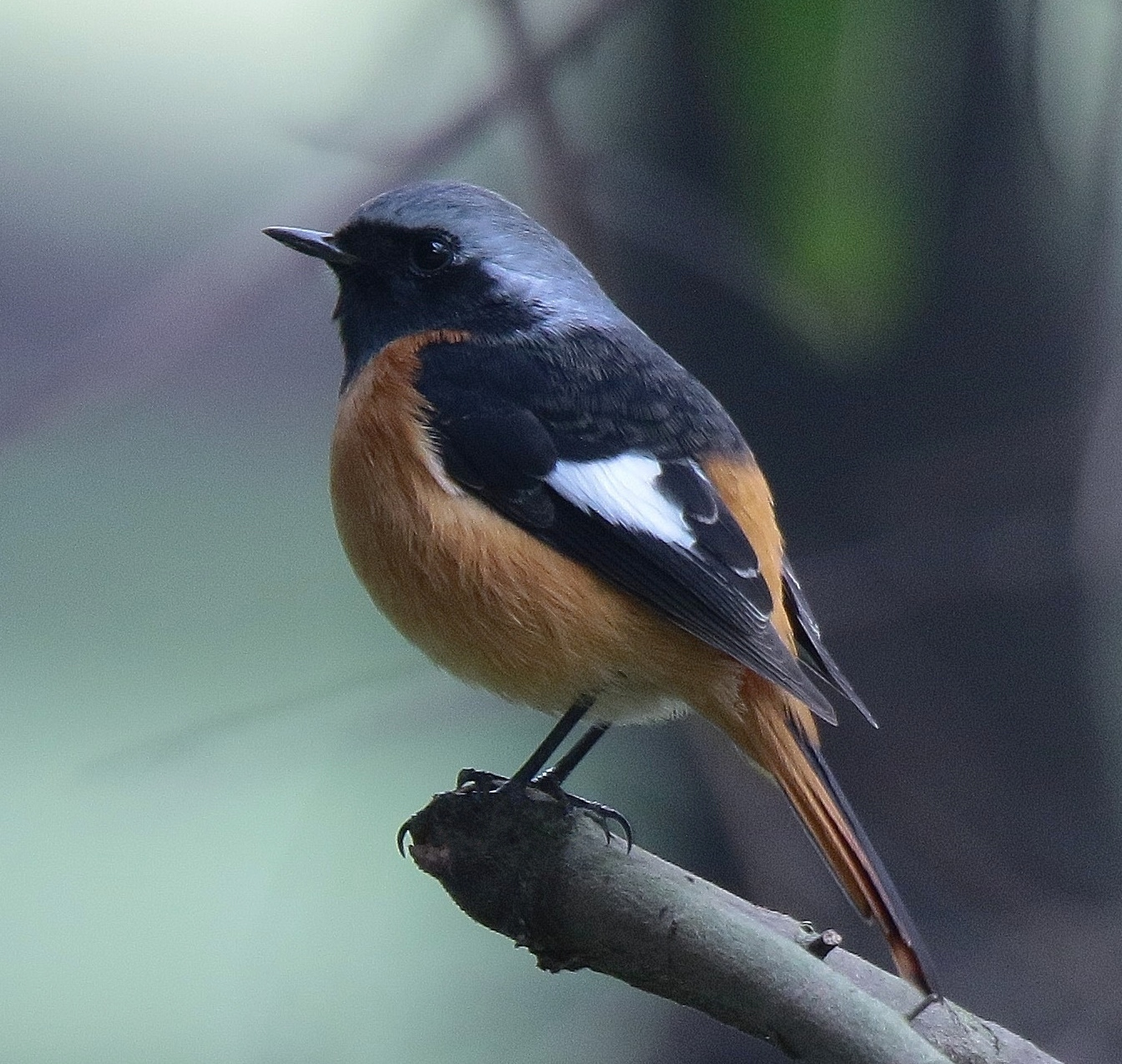
Male in Vietnam

Daurian redstart in Japan
