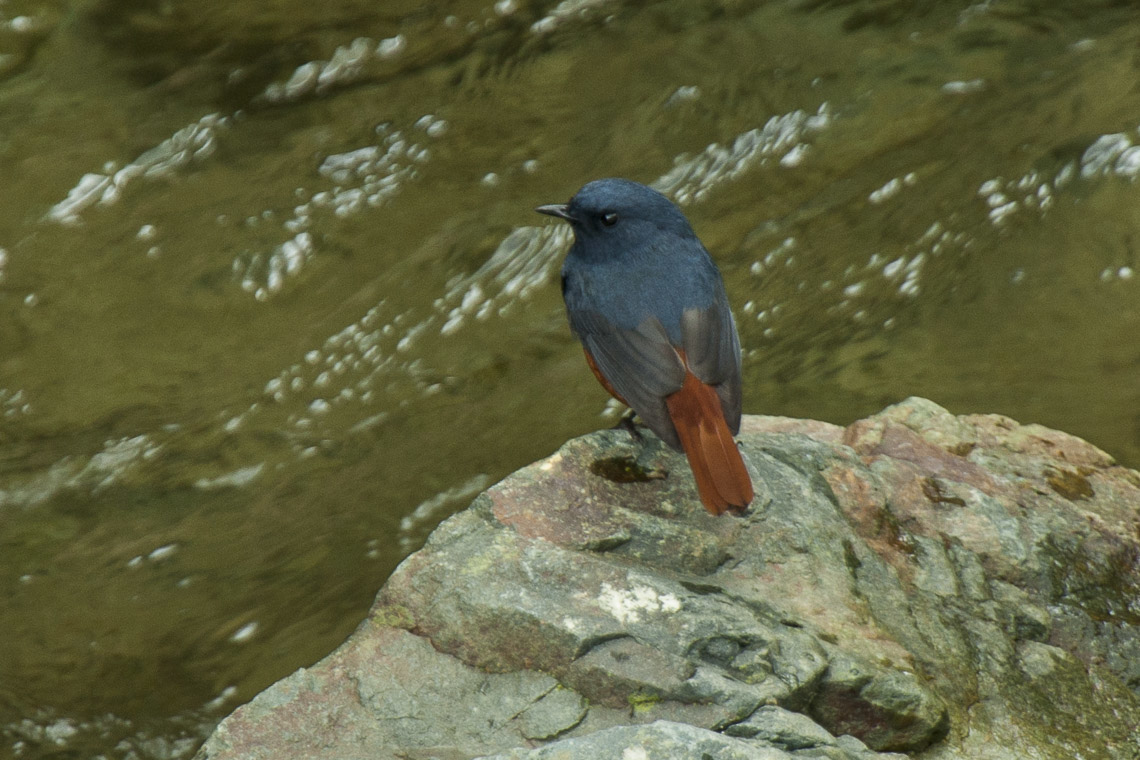
- Male

Conservation status
- Near Threatened (IUCN 3.1)

Scientific classification
- Kingdom: Animalia
- Phylum: Chordata
- Class: Aves
- Order: Passeriformes
- Family: Muscicapidae
- Genus: Phoenicurus
- Species: P. bicolor

Binomial name
- Phoenicurus bicolor (Ogilvie-Grant, 1894)

Synonyms
- Rhyacornis bicolor

= Luzon water redstart =

Species of bird

The Luzon water redstart (Phoenicurus bicolor), also known as the Luzon redstart, is a species of bird in the family Muscicapidae. It is endemic to the Philippines found primarily on Luzon with no records in Mindoro since 1965. Its natural habitats are tropical moist lowland forest, tropical moist montane forest where it is typically found on the banks of fast flowing rivers. It is threatened by habitat loss.

== Description and taxonomy ==
A small bird found in the fast flowing streams near montane forest. Its plummage is primarily dark grayish blue with a reddish brown belly and tail. They exhibit sexual dimorphism which males have the red belly and vents with the females having a plainer and more uniform blue plumage.

Its song is described as a series of ascending notes forming a quivering whistle.

This species is most similar to the Plumbeous water redstart but more extensive reddish brown or rufous on rump and belly. These two similar species was formerly placed in the genus Rhyacornis but was moved to Phoenicurus based on the results of a molecular phylogenetic study published in 2010.

== Ecology and behavior ==
Its primary diet includes small invertebrates taken from the water's edge or in flight. Forages mostly around the stream hopping from boulder to boulder. Typically seen in pairs.

Nest recorded in February and March and a fledgling observed in May. Nest was found 1.5 meters on a rocky bank. Clutch size consists of 2 to 4 eggs, typically 3.

== Habitat and conservation status ==
It inhabits the sides of clean, fast-flowing mountain streams and rivers, above 300 m. Adjacent habitat includes tropical montane forest, pine forest or just scrub and scattered trees. Records from Dalton Pass between August and December indicate that some birds wander post-breeding.

IUCN has assessed this bird as a vulnerable species with the population estimated at 2,500 to 9,999 mature individuals and continuing to decline. In 2020, this species was downlisted to a near-threatened species with the population estimate remaining the same.

This species is restricted to fast flowing freshwater streams. In areas with good habitat, it is reasonably common with 1 pair recorded every 100-200 meters of stream. Its main threat is habitat degradation caused by pollution of its streams through mining and dumping of trash and agro-chemicals. It is also affected by legal and illegal logging and conversion of forest into farmland.

It occurs in a few protected areas such as Northern Sierra Madre Natural Park, Maria Aurora National Park, Balbalasang-Balbalan National Park and Mount Pulag National Park. However, as with most areas in the Philippines, protection from hunting and illegal logging is lax.

Conservation actions proposed include surveys of suitable mountain streams to clarify its distribution, population status and the influence of pollution and siltation on population. Research its ecological requirements and seasonal movements to facilitate conservation planning. Propose formal protection for other key sites. Stricted enforcement on controlling river pollution, mining and logging. Monitor water quality and habitat conditions in areas downstream of mining operations. Campaign for a ban on mining in key areas for this species.
