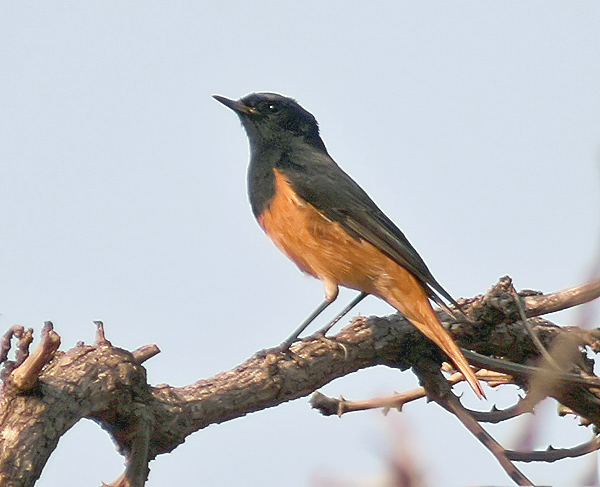
- Black redstart (Phoenicurus ochruros)

Scientific classification
- Kingdom: Animalia
- Phylum: Chordata
- Class: Aves
- Order: Passeriformes
- Family: Muscicapidae
- Subfamily: Saxicolinae
- Genus: Phoenicurus; Forster, T, 1817

Type species
- Phoenicurus ruticilla = Motacilla phoenicurus T. Forster, 1817

= Phoenicurus =

Genus of birds

Phoenicurus is a genus of passerine birds in the Old World flycatcher family Muscicapidae, native to Europe, Asia and Africa. They are named redstarts from their orange-red tails ('start' is an old name for a tail). They are small insectivores, the males mostly brightly coloured in various combinations of red, blue, white, and black, the females light brown with a red tail.

== Taxonomy ==
The genus Phoenicurus was introduced by the English naturalist Thomas Forster in 1817 with the type species (by tautonymy) as the common redstart (Phoenicurus phoenicurus). The name Phoenicurus is from Ancient Greek φοινιξ (phoinix), "(Phoenician) crimson/purple" (see also Tyrian purple), and ουροσ (-ouros) -"tailed". A molecular phylogenetic study published in 2010 led to a reorganization of the Old World flycatchers family in which the two species in Rhyacornis and the single species in Chaimarrornis were merged into Phoenicurus.

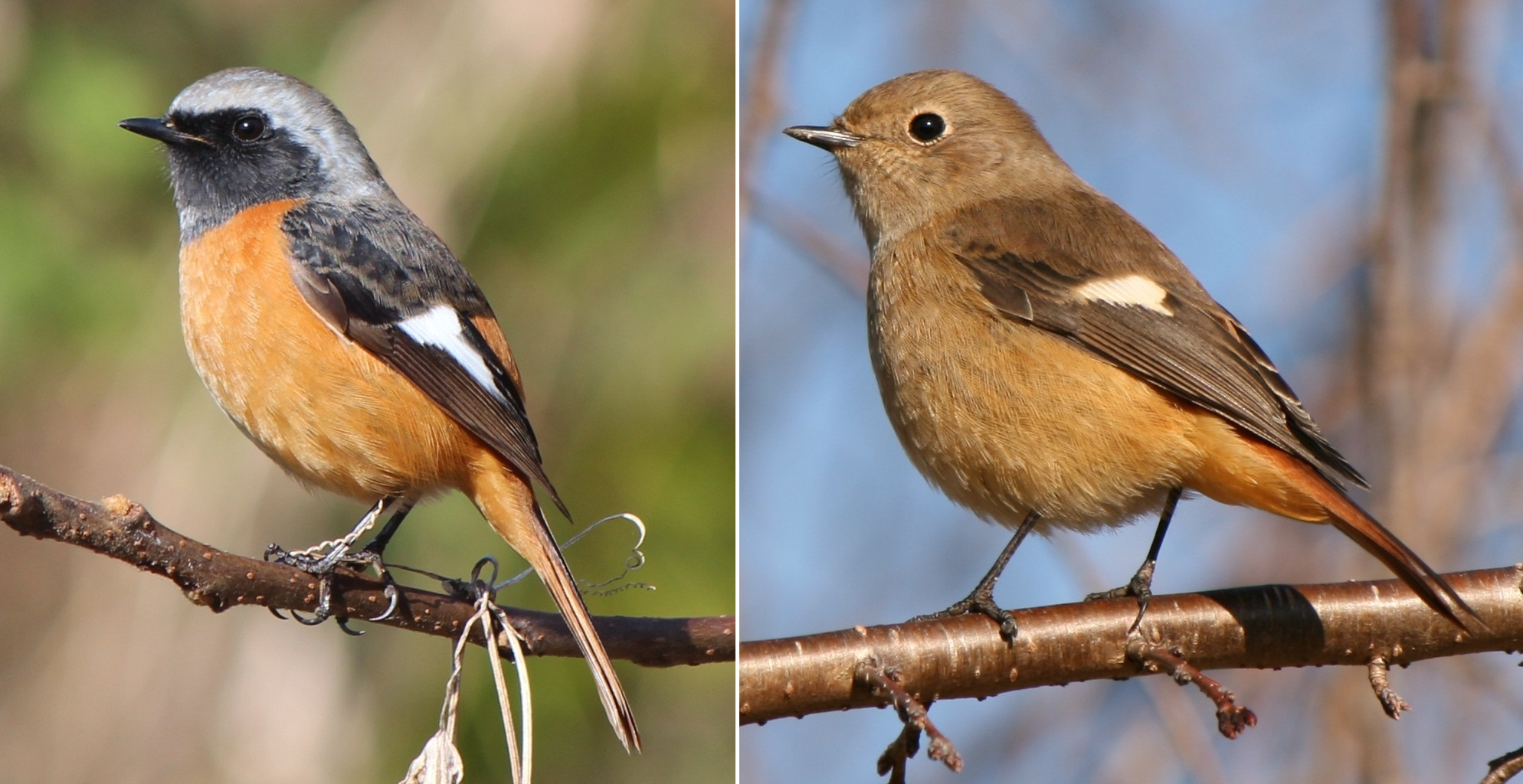
The species in the genus exhibit pronounced sexual dimorphism. Pictured are a male (left) and a female Daurian redstart

The genus contains the following species:

- Przevalski's redstart (Phoenicurus alaschanicus)
- Eversmann's redstart (Phoenicurus erythronotus)
- Blue-capped redstart (Phoenicurus coeruleocephala)
- Black redstart (Phoenicurus ochruros)
- Common redstart (Phoenicurus phoenicurus)
- Hodgson's redstart (Phoenicurus hodgsoni)
- White-throated redstart (Phoenicurus schisticeps)
- Daurian redstart (Phoenicurus auroreus)
- Moussier's redstart (Phoenicurus moussieri)
- Güldenstädt's redstart (Phoenicurus erythrogastrus)
- Blue-fronted redstart (Phoenicurus frontalis)
- Plumbeous water redstart (Phoenicurus fuliginosus) (previously in the genus Rhyacornis)
- Luzon water redstart (Phoenicurus bicolor) (previously in the genus Rhyacornis)
- White-capped redstart (Phoenicurus leucocephalus) (previously in the monotypic genus Chaimarrornis)

== Fossil record ==
- †Phoenicurus erikai (Pliocene of Csarnota, Hungary).
- †Phoenicurus baranensis (Pliocene of Beremend, Hungary).
