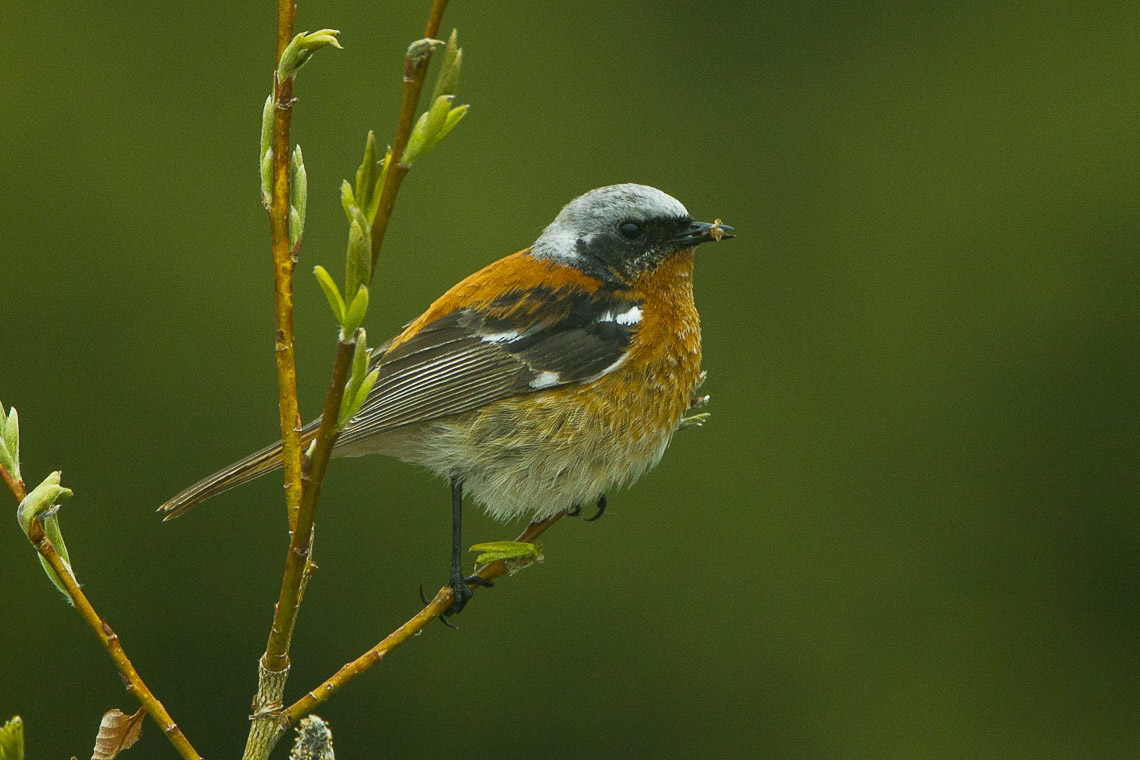
- Adult male in breeding plumage

Conservation status
- Least Concern (IUCN 3.1)

Scientific classification
- Kingdom: Animalia
- Phylum: Chordata
- Class: Aves
- Order: Passeriformes
- Family: Muscicapidae
- Genus: Phoenicurus
- Species: P. erythronotus

Binomial name
- Phoenicurus erythronotus (Eversmann, 1841)

Synonyms
- Phoenicurus erythronota

= Eversmann's redstart =

Species of bird

Eversmann's redstart (Phoenicurus erythronotus), also known as the rufous-backed redstart, is a passerine bird belonging to the genus Phoenicurus. It was formerly classified in the thrush family Turdidae but is now placed in the Old World flycatcher family Muscicapidae. It was described by the German biologist Eduard Friedrich Eversmann who is commemorated in the bird's English name.

== Description ==
It is one of the larger redstarts, 15 to 16 cm (5.9 to 6.3 in) long with a wingspan of 25.5 to 27 cm (10.0 to 10.6 in) and weigh 15 to 22 g (0.53 to 0.78 oz). The bill and legs are black. The male in breeding plumage has a black mask and grey crown and nape. The back and rump are rufous and the tail is also rufous apart from the darker central feathers. The wings are dark with white patches on the scapulars and primary-coverts. The underparts are mainly rufous with white on the belly and undertail-coverts.

Non-breeding and first-winter males are similar but much duller and browner. Females are mostly grey-brown. They have a rufous tail with a dark centre, a pale eye-ring, two buff wingbars and buff edges to the tertials.

The song is loud and lively. The birds also have a soft, croaking call and a whistling call. The tail is often flicked up and down.

== Ecology ==
=== Distribution ===
It breeds in the mountains of Central Asia and southern Siberia from the Tien Shan range to the Tarbagatay and Altay Mountains and near Lake Baikal. Some birds move downhill for the winter while others, especially in the north-east of the range, migrate longer distances. The wintering range extends from southern Iraq through Iran and Pakistan to the western Himalayas of Kashmir. A few birds reach eastern Arabia. It has occurred as a vagrant in Israel and Turkey.

=== Habitat ===
It inhabits forest and woodland during the breeding season, reaching 5,400 meters above sea-level. In winter it is seen in more open and arid habitats.

=== Diet ===
Insects form the bulk of its diet during the breeding season but fruit and seeds are important in winter. It typically forages by lunging at prey from a low perch, but it also moves on the ground.

=== Breeding ===
The breeding season occurs from June to July in central Asia and southern Siberia. The nest, a cup-shaped structure composed of grass stems and moss with a foundation of twigs, is lined with wool and fur for insulation. Typically placed on the ground, concealed beneath roots or amongst rocks. The clutch ranges from three to six eggs, exhibiting a pale green colouration with brownish-grey speckles.

== Status ==
The species has a large range and a large population with stable development that is not believed to be under any substantial threat. Based on these criteria, the International Union for Conservation of Nature (IUCN) categorizes the species as "Least Concern". The global population has not been estimated but it is described as fairly common to locally very common in southern Russia, rare in China and locally frequent in winter in Pakistan.
