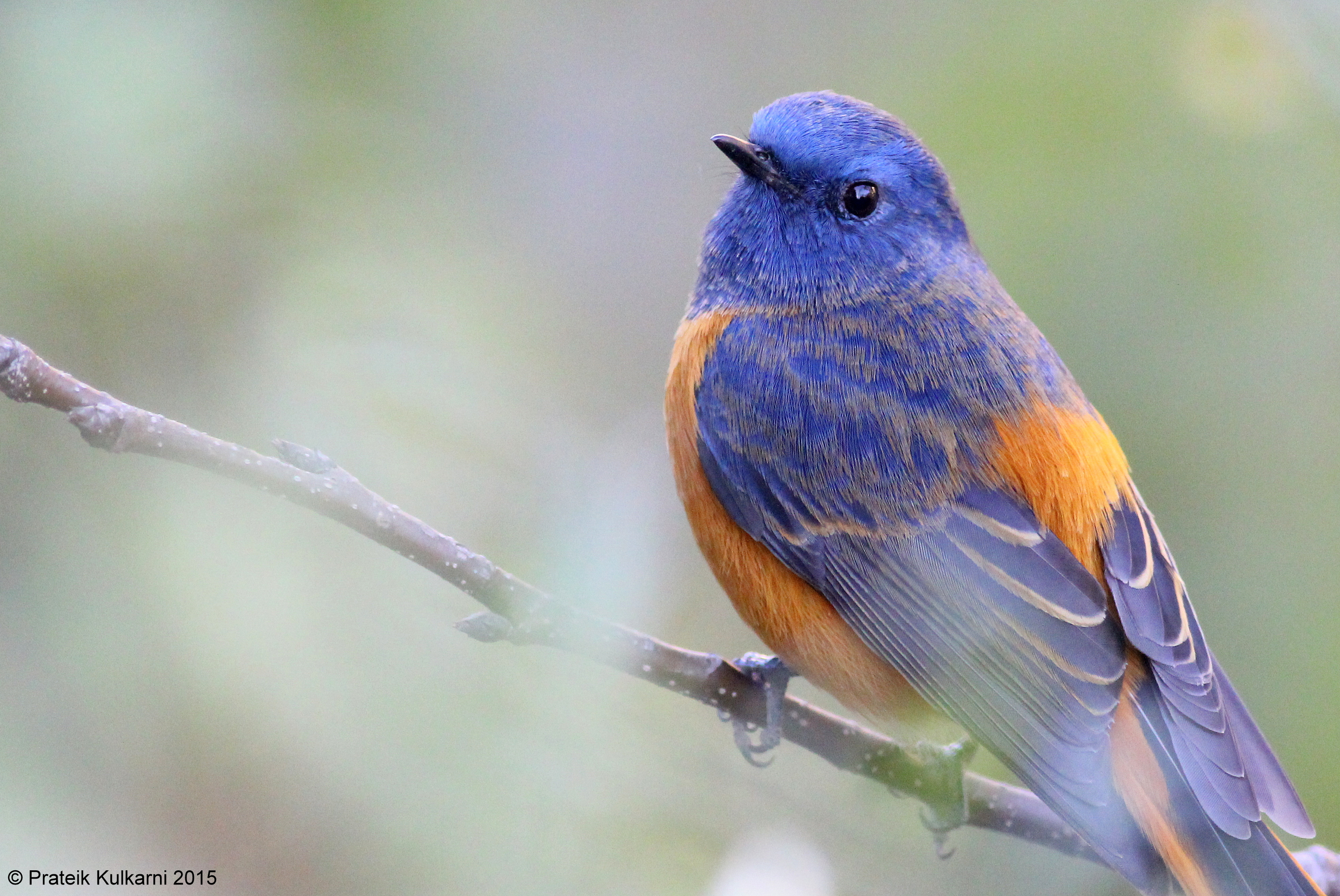
- male from Sattal near Nainital, Uttarakhand, India

Conservation status
- Least Concern (IUCN 3.1)

Scientific classification
- Kingdom: Animalia
- Phylum: Chordata
- Class: Aves
- Order: Passeriformes
- Family: Muscicapidae
- Genus: Phoenicurus
- Species: P. frontalis

Binomial name
- Phoenicurus frontalis Vigors, 1831

= Blue-fronted redstart =

Species of bird

The blue-fronted redstart (Phoenicurus frontalis) is a species of bird in the family Muscicapidae, the Old World flycatchers. It breeds in central China and the Himalayas (where it winters in the southern foothills, as well as in southern Yunnan, the Patkai and northern Indochina. Its natural habitat is temperate forests. The female is brownish-grey, with paler underparts.

== Gallery ==
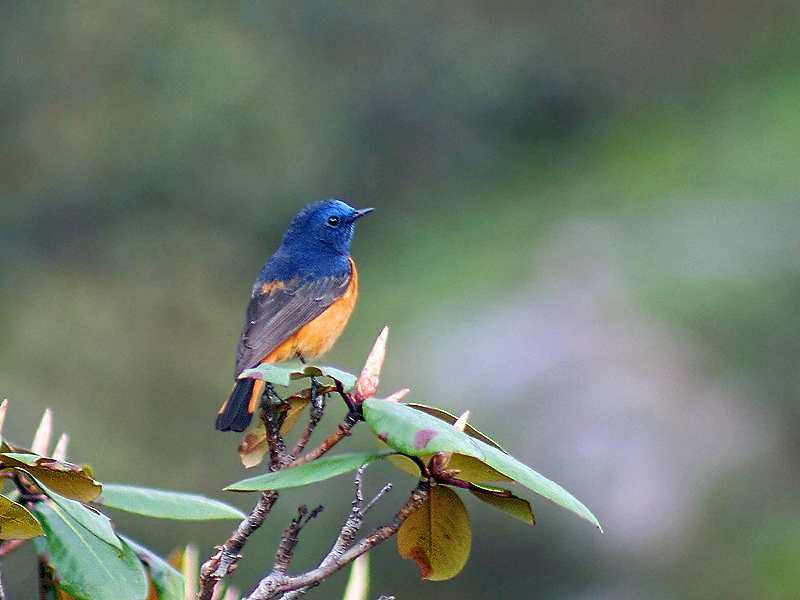
Male at Mailee Thaatch (10,500 ft.) in Kullu-Manali District. of Himachal Pradesh, India

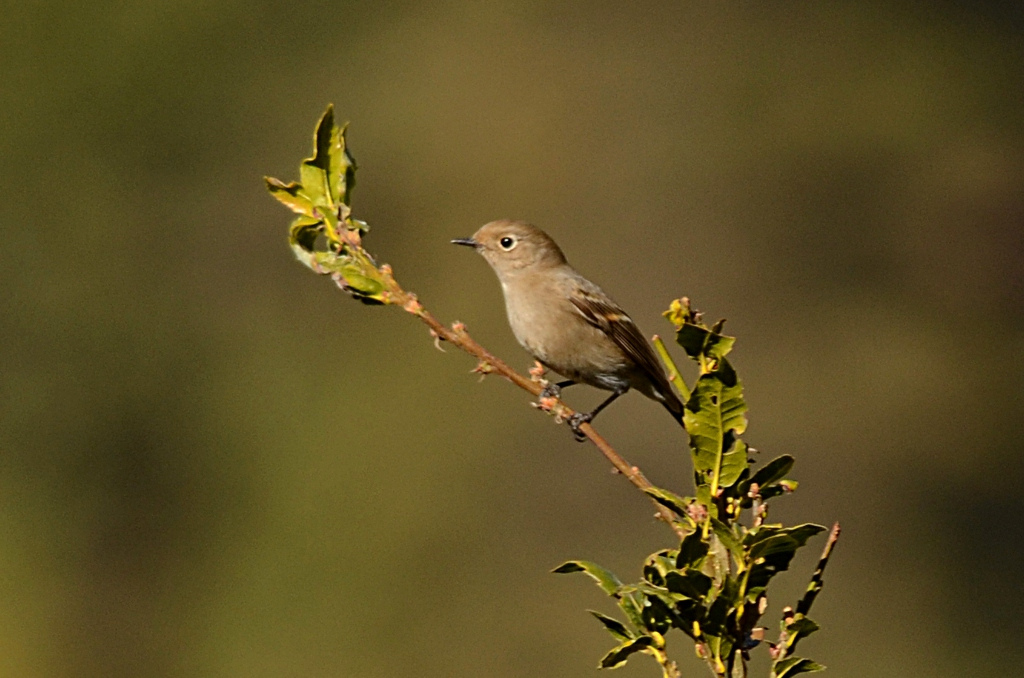
Female in Pangot, Uttarakhand, India

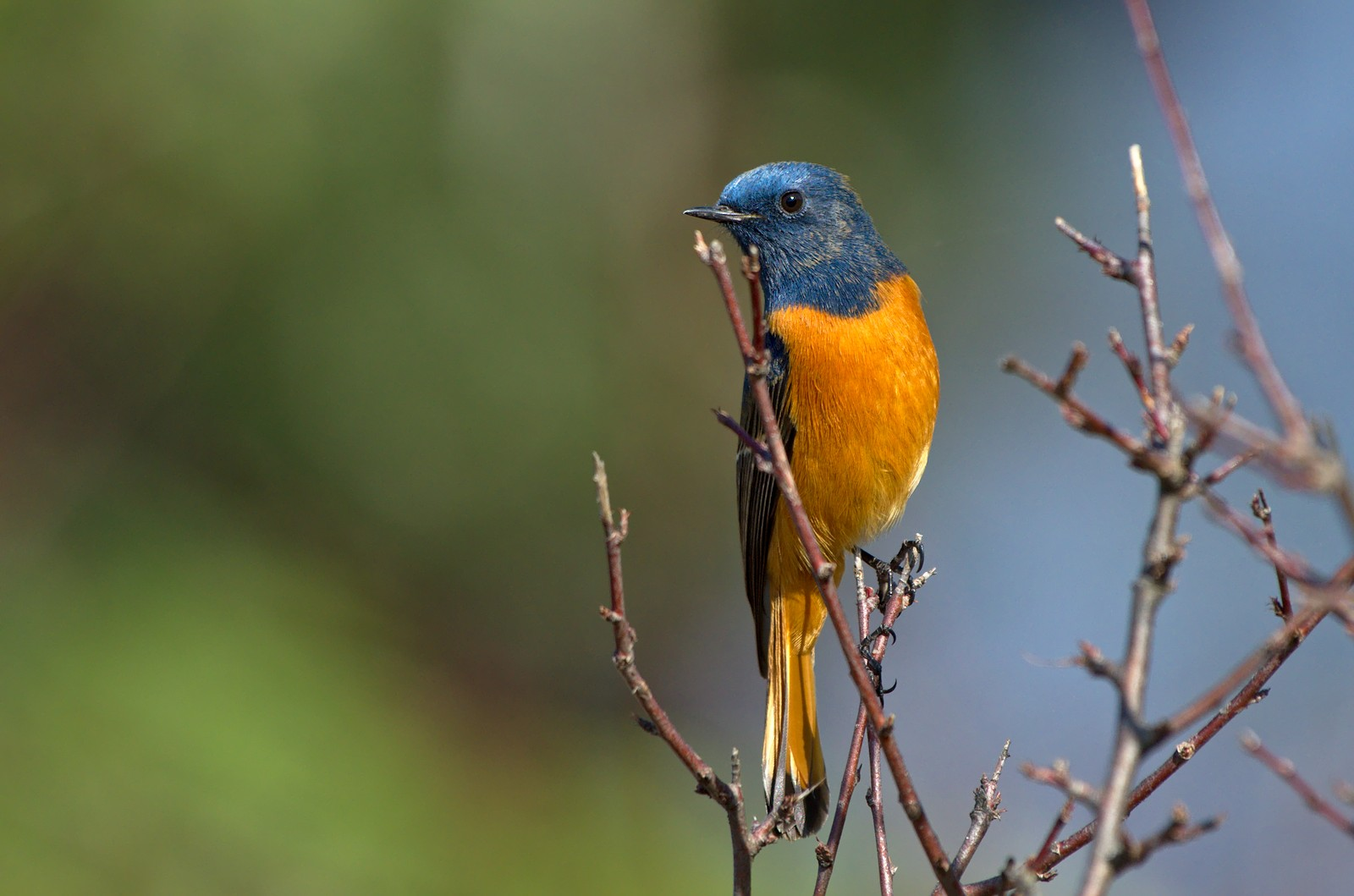
A particularly bold Blue-fronted Redstart at Deoria Taal, Uttarakhand
