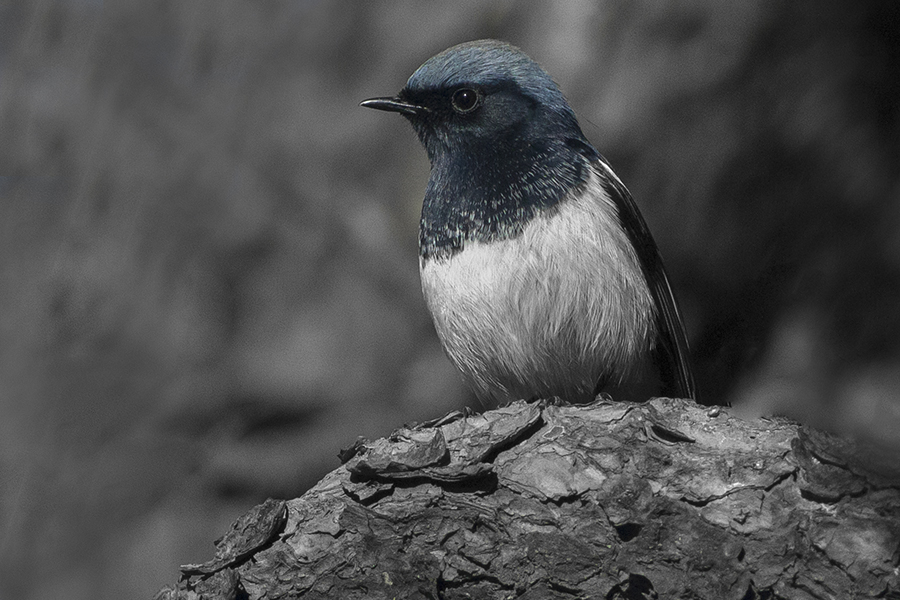
- Male from Uttarakhand, India

Conservation status
- Least Concern (IUCN 3.1)

Scientific classification
- Kingdom: Animalia
- Phylum: Chordata
- Class: Aves
- Order: Passeriformes
- Family: Muscicapidae
- Genus: Phoenicurus
- Species: P. coeruleocephala

Binomial name
- Phoenicurus coeruleocephala (Vigors, 1831)

Synonyms
- Phoenicurus caeruleocephala

= Blue-capped redstart =

Species of bird

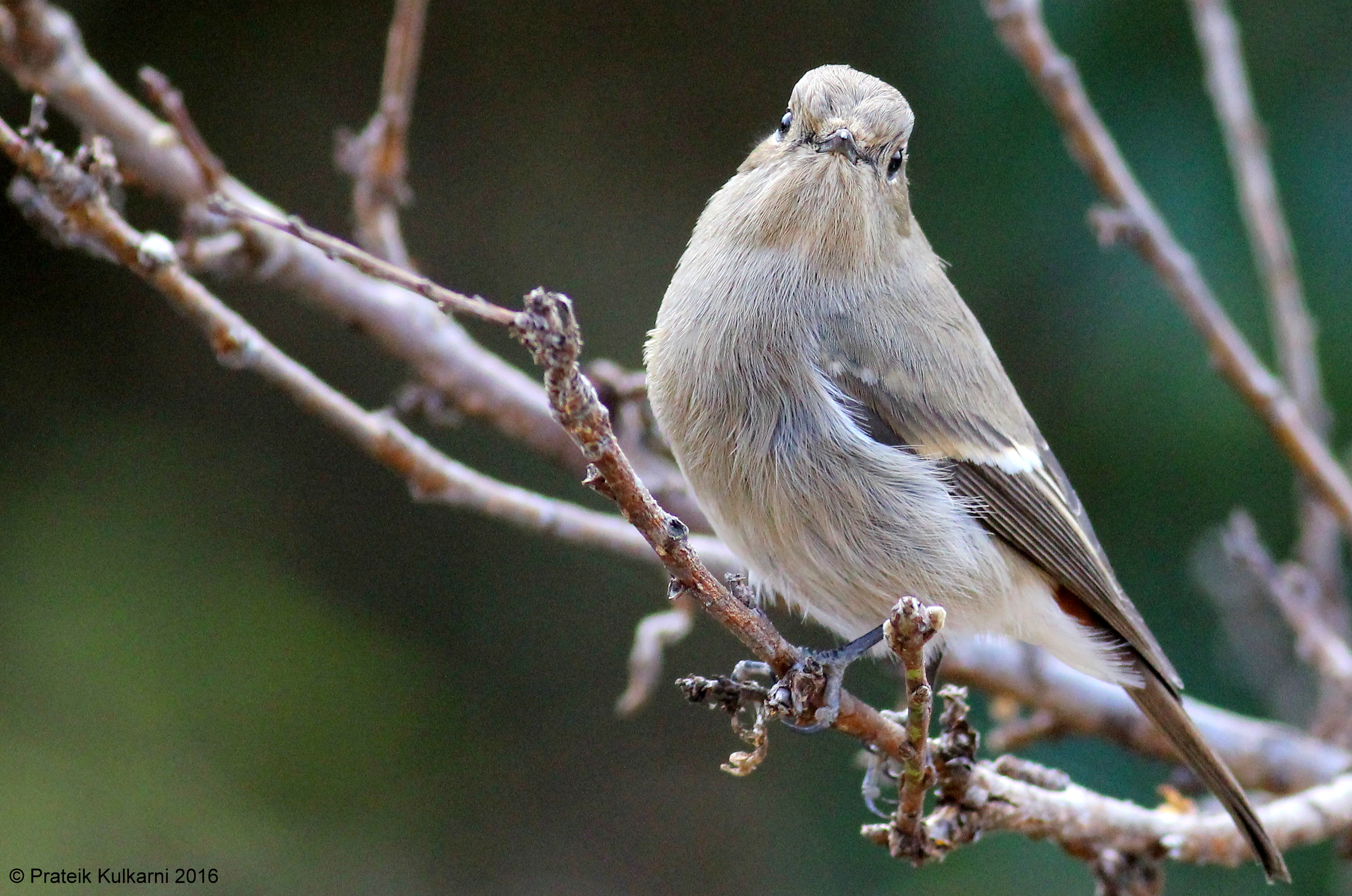
Blue-capped Redstart (female) at Pangot, Nainital, Uttarakhand, India

The blue-capped redstart (Phoenicurus coeruleocephala) is a species of bird in the family Muscicapidae.

Its range extends in an arch across the eastern Alpide belt : from the Altai Mountains to central Nepal.

Its natural habitat is temperate forests.
