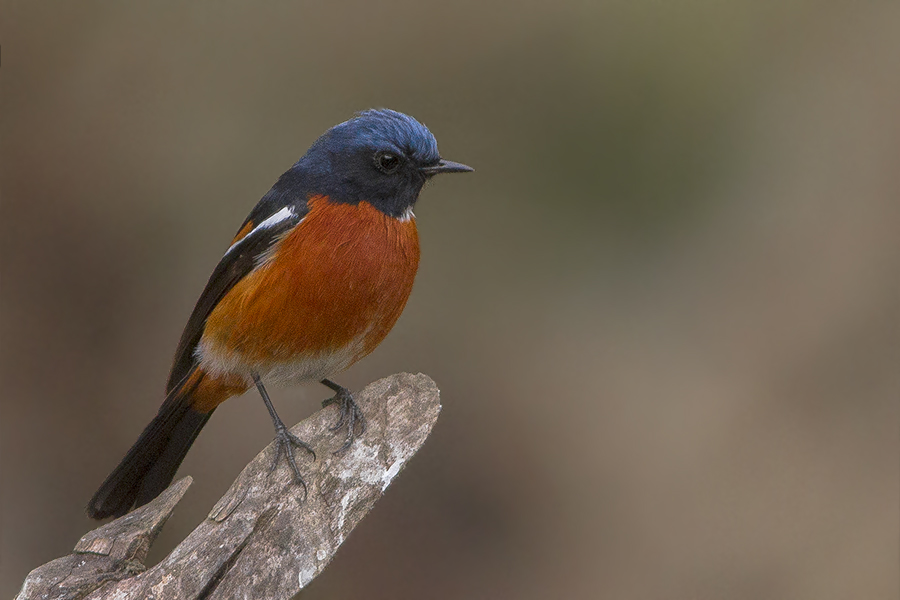
- From Khangchendzonga Biosphere Reserve, West Sikkim, India

Conservation status
- Least Concern (IUCN 3.1)

Scientific classification
- Kingdom: Animalia
- Phylum: Chordata
- Class: Aves
- Order: Passeriformes
- Family: Muscicapidae
- Genus: Phoenicurus
- Species: P. schisticeps

Binomial name
- Phoenicurus schisticeps (Gray, JE & Gray, GR, 1847)

= White-throated redstart =

Species of bird

The white-throated redstart (Phoenicurus schisticeps) is a species of bird in the family Muscicapidae.

It is found in Nepal, Bhutan, central China and far northern areas of Myanmar and Northeast India.

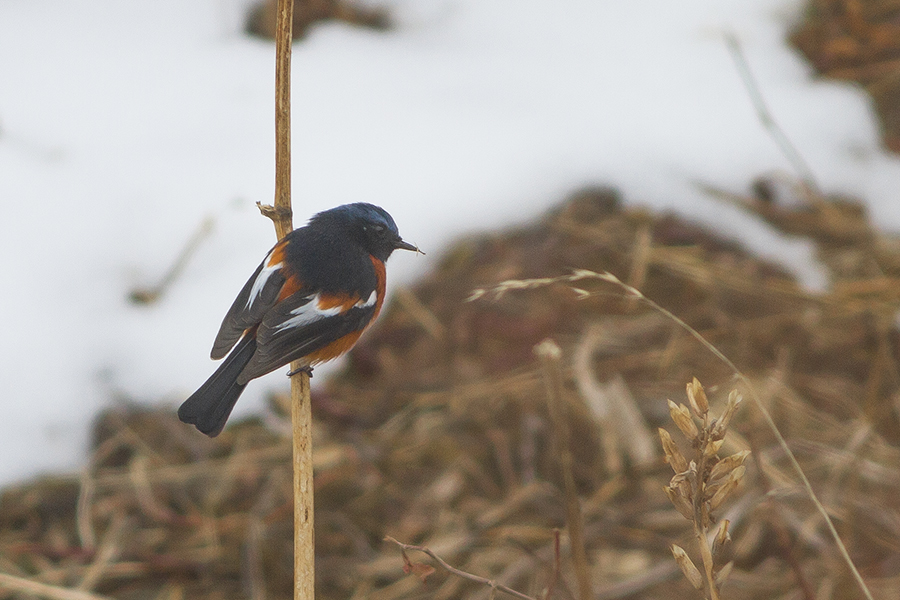
From Pangolakha Wildlife Sanctuary, East Sikkim, India in alpine snowy meadows.

Its natural habitat is temperate forests.
