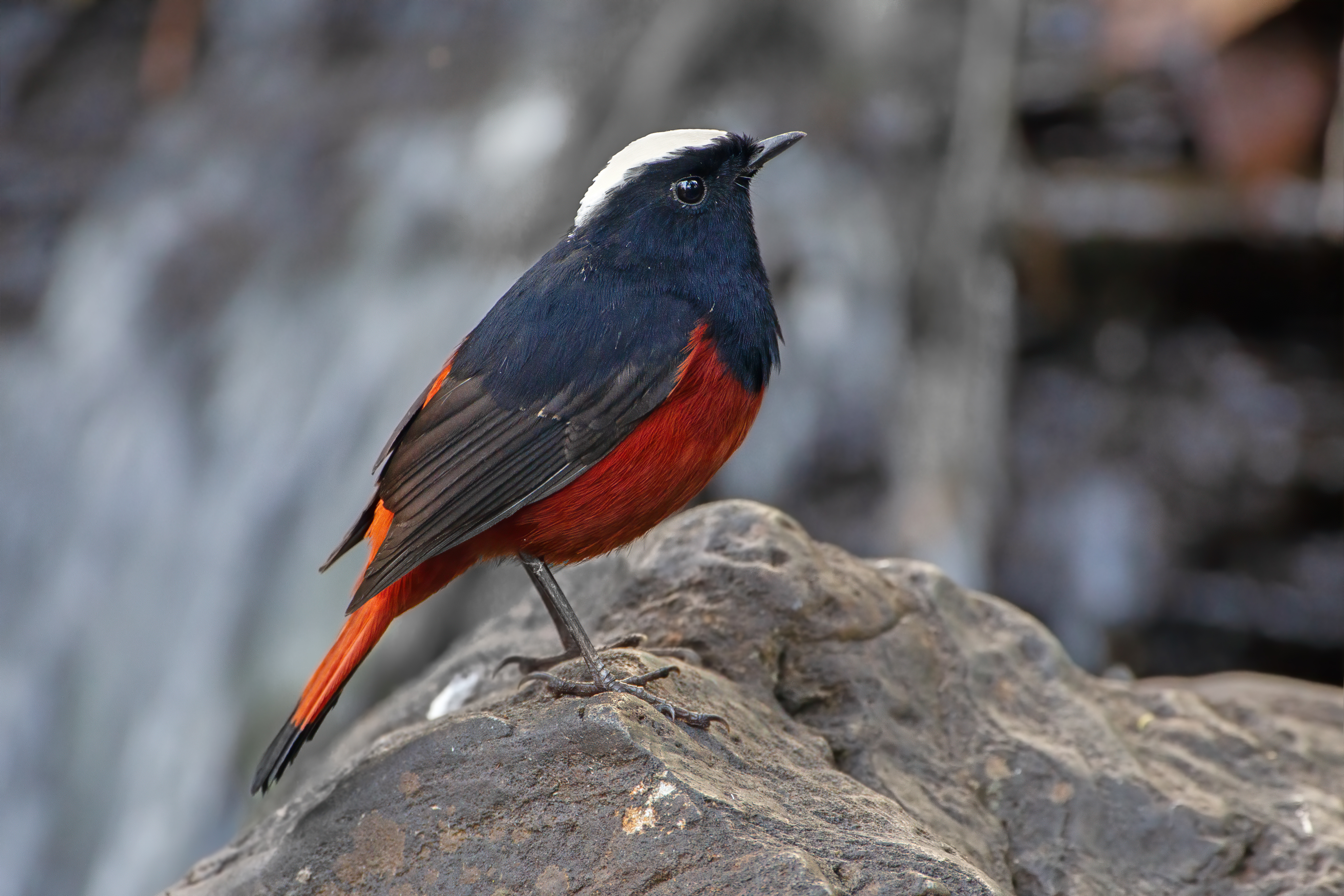

Conservation status
- Least Concern (IUCN 3.1)

Scientific classification
- Kingdom: Animalia
- Phylum: Chordata
- Class: Aves
- Order: Passeriformes
- Family: Muscicapidae
- Genus: Phoenicurus
- Species: P. leucocephalus

Binomial name
- Phoenicurus leucocephalus Vigors, 1831

Synonyms
- Chaimarrornis leucocephalus

= White-capped redstart =

Species of bird

The white-capped redstart or white-capped water redstart (Phoenicurus leucocephalus) is a passerine bird of the Old World flycatcher family Muscicapidae native to the Indian subcontinent, Southeast Asia, much of China, and to certain regions of Central Asia.

== Description ==
Both sexes are black with red underparts and white crown atop their heads. Males have a larger white pattern on top of the head and brown or red spots under the wings. It is found in the Indian subcontinent and Southeast Asia, as well as some adjoining areas. The species ranges across Afghanistan, Bangladesh, Bhutan, Cambodia, India, Laos, Myanmar, Nepal, Tajikistan, Thailand, Tibet and Vietnam. Its natural habitat is temperate forests.

This species was formerly placed in the monotypic genus Chaimarrornis but was moved to Phoenicurus based on the results of a molecular phylogenetic study published in 2010.
