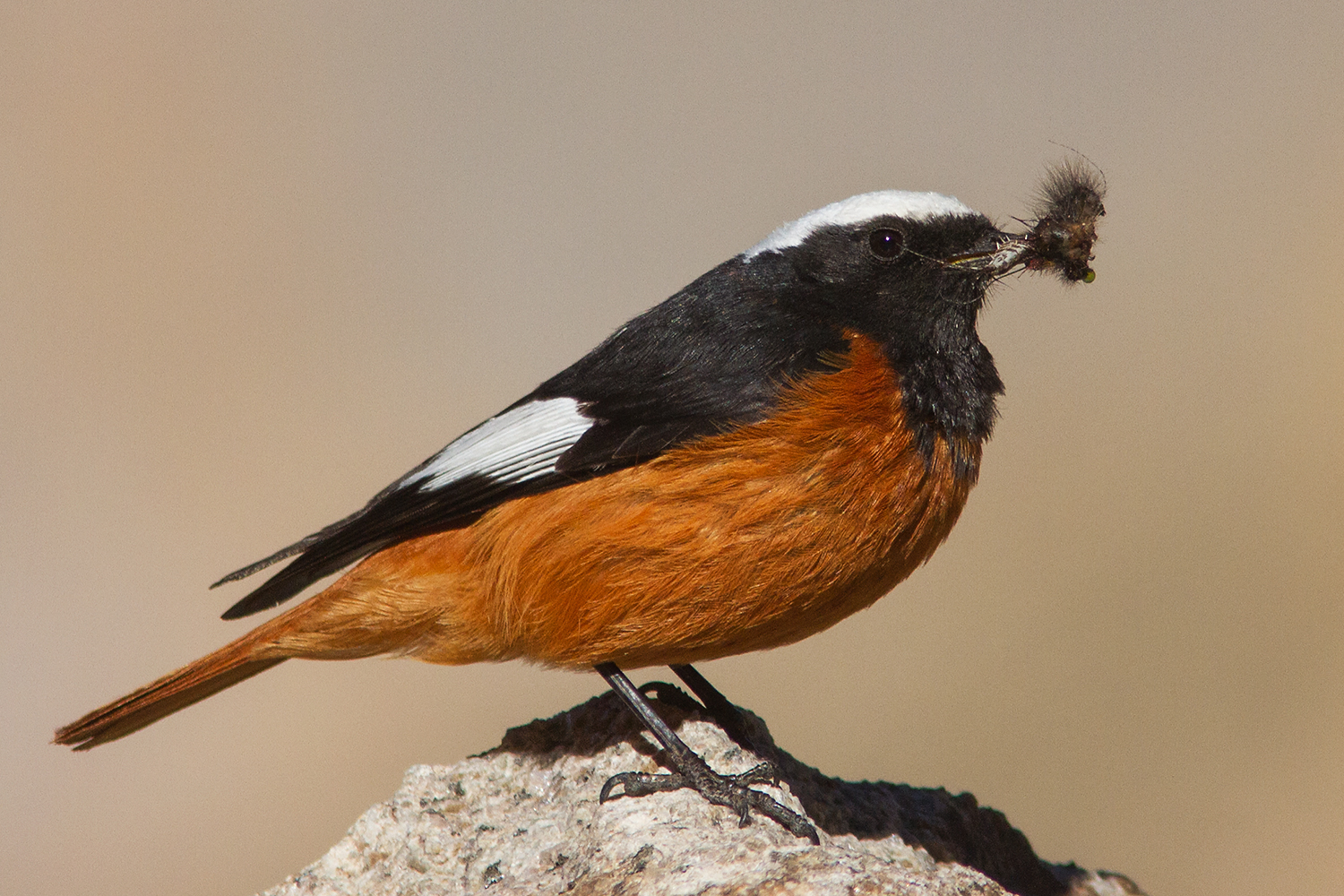
- Güldenstädt's redstart (male) from Ladakh, India

Conservation status
- Least Concern (IUCN 3.1)

Scientific classification
- Kingdom: Animalia
- Phylum: Chordata
- Class: Aves
- Order: Passeriformes
- Family: Muscicapidae
- Genus: Phoenicurus
- Species: P. erythrogastrus

Binomial name
- Phoenicurus erythrogastrus (Güldenstädt, 1775)

= Güldenstädt's redstart =

Species of bird

Güldenstädt's redstart (Phoenicurus erythrogastrus), also known as the white-winged redstart, is a species of bird in the genus Phoenicurus, family Muscicapidae. It is found in the high mountains of the southwestern and central Palearctic in the Caucasus, Karakoram, Pamir, Himalaya, Tian Shan, and Altai, in the countries of Afghanistan, Armenia, Azerbaijan, Bhutan, China, Georgia, India, Iran, Kazakhstan, Mongolia, Nepal, Pakistan, Russia, Tajikistan, Turkmenistan, and Uzbekistan.

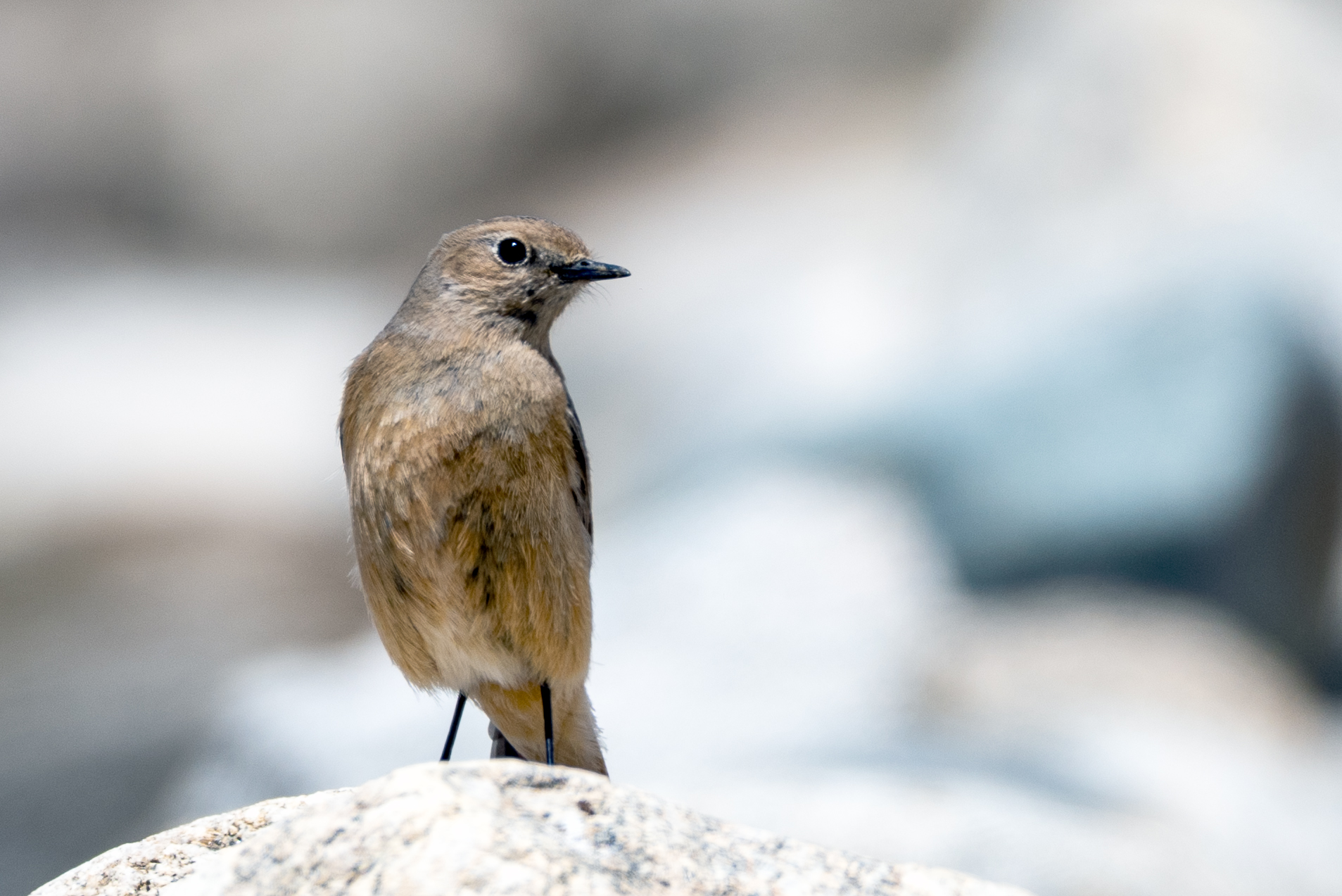
Female at Leh, India

It is one of the largest redstarts, 18 cm (7.1 in) long and 21–29 g (0.74–1.02 oz) weight. The adult male is black above except for a white crown, a white patch on the wing, and an orange-red tail; below, the throat and upper breast are black, and the rest of the underparts a rich orange-red. The female and immature male are brown above and orange-buff below, with an orange-red tail.

It breeds at high altitudes from 3,600–5,200 m (11,810–17,060 ft) in alpine meadows and rock-fields, moving slightly lower to 1,500–4,800 m in winter where it occurs mainly in subalpine Hippophae scrub; some populations, notably the northernmost in the mountains around Lake Baikal, migrate further, reaching northeastern China. It feeds on fruit and a wide variety of invertebrates.

== Taxonomy and relationships ==
There are two subspecies:

- Phoenicurus erythrogastrus erythrogastrus, Caucasus
- Phoenicurus erythrogastrus grandis, Central Asian mountains

In plumage and size the male closely resembles the white-capped redstart Chaimarrornis leucocephalus, sharing the black upperparts and white crown, but lacking the white wing patch. Although the white-capped redstart is currently placed in a separate genus Chaimarrornis, this genus is not genetically distinct and is likely to be merged into Phoenicurus in the future. Male Güldenstädt's redstarts also show some plumage similarities to the much smaller Moussier's redstart P. moussieri, including the white wing patch, while the females more resemble an outsized common redstart.

The scientific name was usually cited in older texts as Phoenicurus erythrogaster, though this is an error in Latin grammar.
