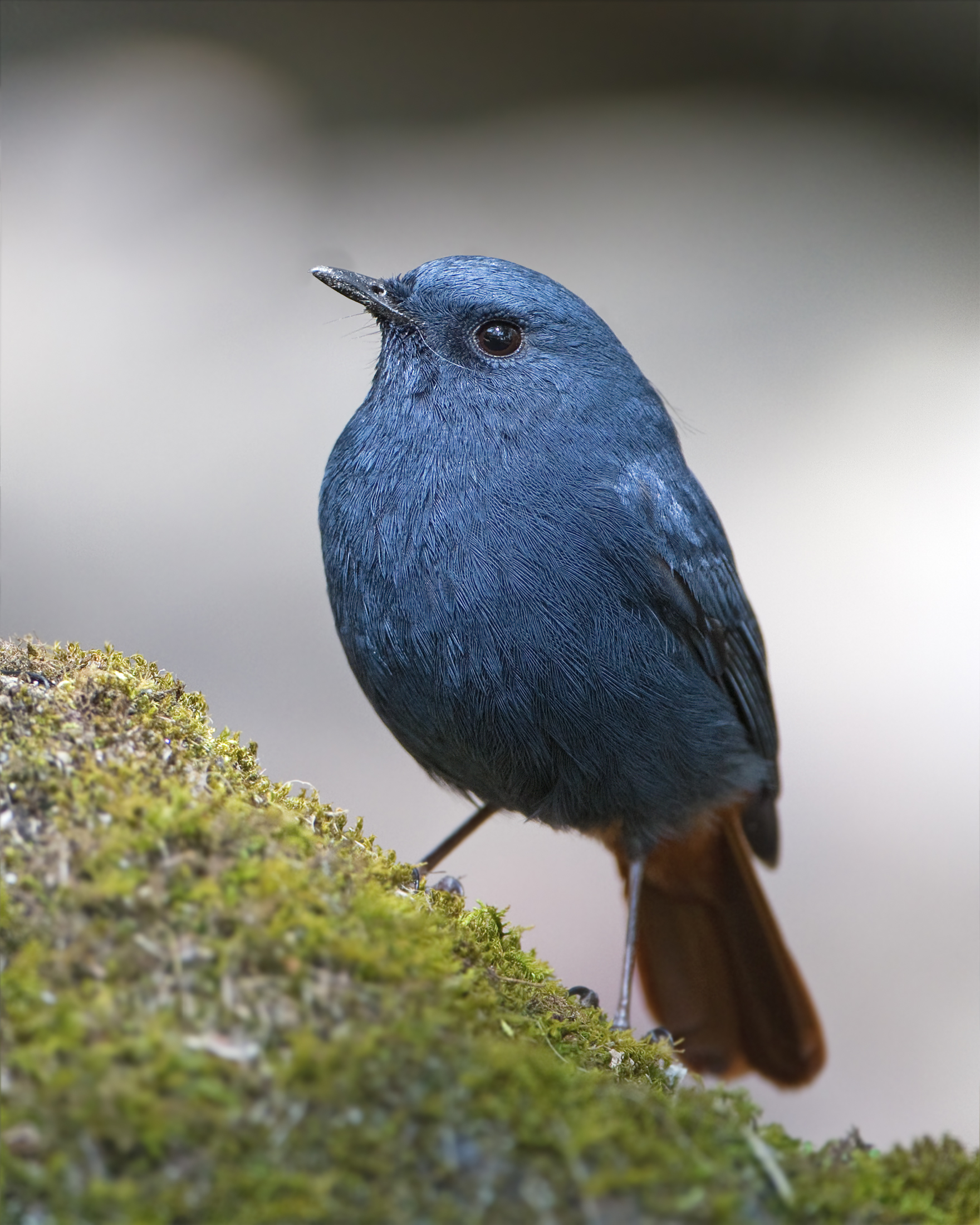
- Male in Doi Inthanon National Park, Thailand
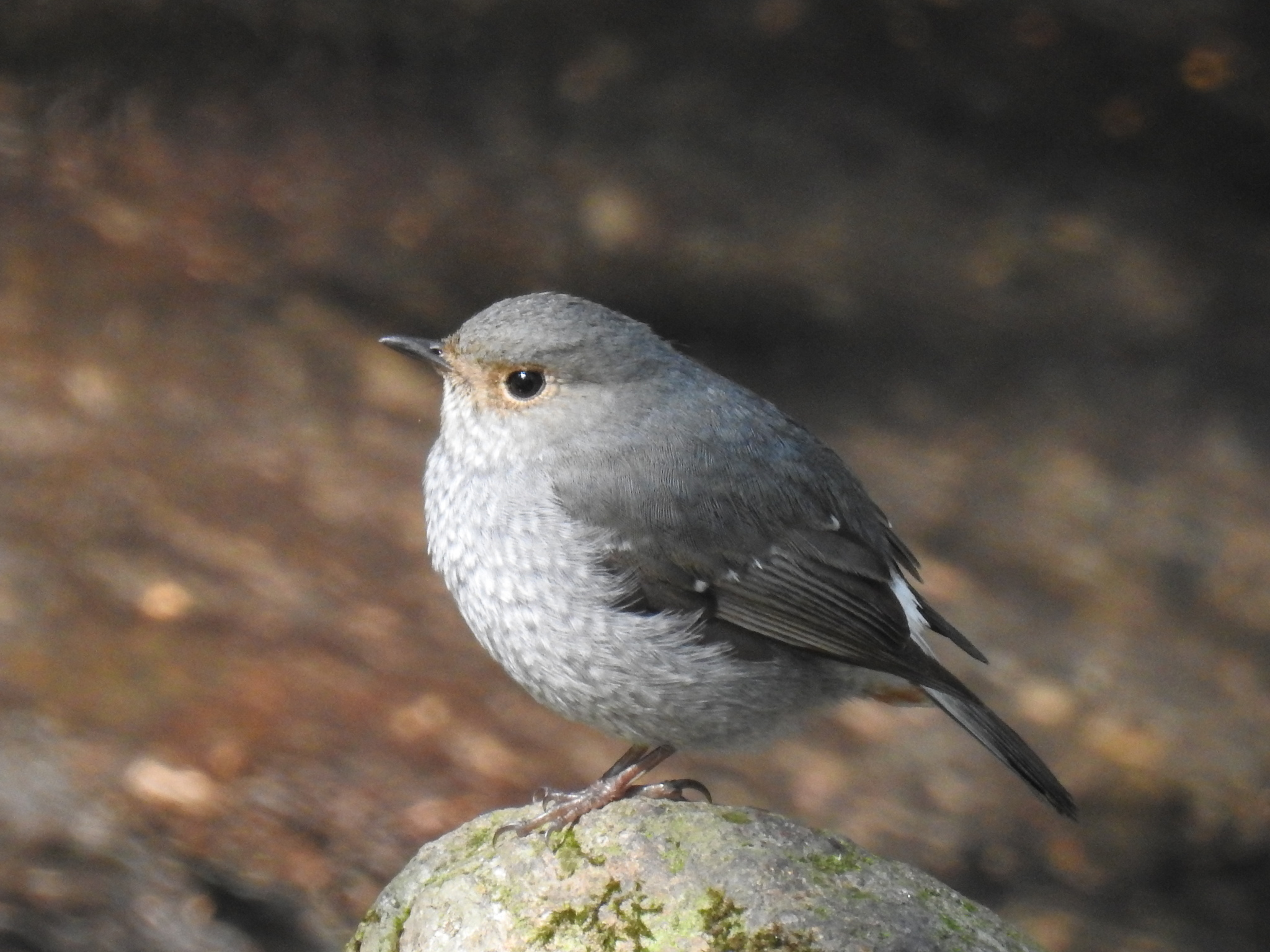
- Female in Plover Cove Country Park, Hong Kong

Conservation status
- Least Concern (IUCN 3.1)

Scientific classification
- Kingdom: Animalia
- Phylum: Chordata
- Class: Aves
- Order: Passeriformes
- Family: Muscicapidae
- Genus: Phoenicurus
- Species: P. fuliginosus

Binomial name
- Phoenicurus fuliginosus Vigors, 1831

Synonyms
- Rhyacornis fuliginosus; Rhyacornis fuliginosa

= Plumbeous water redstart =

Species of bird

The plumbeous water redstart (Phoenicurus fuliginosus) is a passerine bird in the Old World flycatcher family Muscicapidae. It is found in South Asia, Southeast Asia and China. Males are slate blue in colour, while females are grey. The bird's common name refers to its colour which resembles lead. They tend to live near fast-moving streams and rivers.

== Taxonomy ==
The plumbeous water redstart belongs to the order Passeriformes and the family Muscicapidae. It was previously placed in the genus Rhyacornis but was moved to Phoenicurus based on the results of a molecular phylogenetic study published in 2010. The species consists of two recognized subspecies – Phoenicurus fuliginosus fuliginosus and Phoenicurus fuliginosus affinis. The former was described by Nicholas Aylward Vigors in 1831, while the latter was described by William Robert Ogilvie-Grant in 1906 and is found in Taiwan. In China, the female and first-year male redstarts appear more brown at the top, leading to the possibility of classifying them as a separate race tenuirostris.

== Description ==
The plumbeous water redstart is typically 14 centimetres (5.5 in) long in total, with an average weight of 22 grams (0.78 oz) for males and 18.8 grams (0.66 oz) for females. The male birds are slate blue in colour with a tail that is rusty red. On the other hand, female birds are pale grey and feature a white rump.

== Habitat ==
The bird is found in Afghanistan, Bangladesh, Bhutan, China, India, Laos, Myanmar, Nepal, Pakistan, Thailand, and Vietnam. Their preferred habitats are streams, nullahs and rivers with boulders that are shaded, as well as vegetation near riverbanks. Streams with higher populations of insects such as mayflies appear to be preferred.

They are typically found at relatively high elevations, with the ones living in the Himalayas seen between 2,000 metres (6,600 ft) and 4,100 metres (13,500 ft). However, they tend to descend to lower altitudes during the winter.

The plumbeous water redstart has been placed on the Least Concern category of the IUCN Red List, as the population has remained stable throughout the last ten years. The size of its distribution range is over 5,100,000 square kilometres (2,000,000 sq mi).

== Behavior ==
The plumbeous water redstart is very protective of its habitat and will be extremely confrontational to any trespasser on its territory. In order to catch flies in rivers, it flies vertically until it is at least 20 feet (6.1 m) above the water, before gliding down in a spiral back to the same place.

== Gallery ==
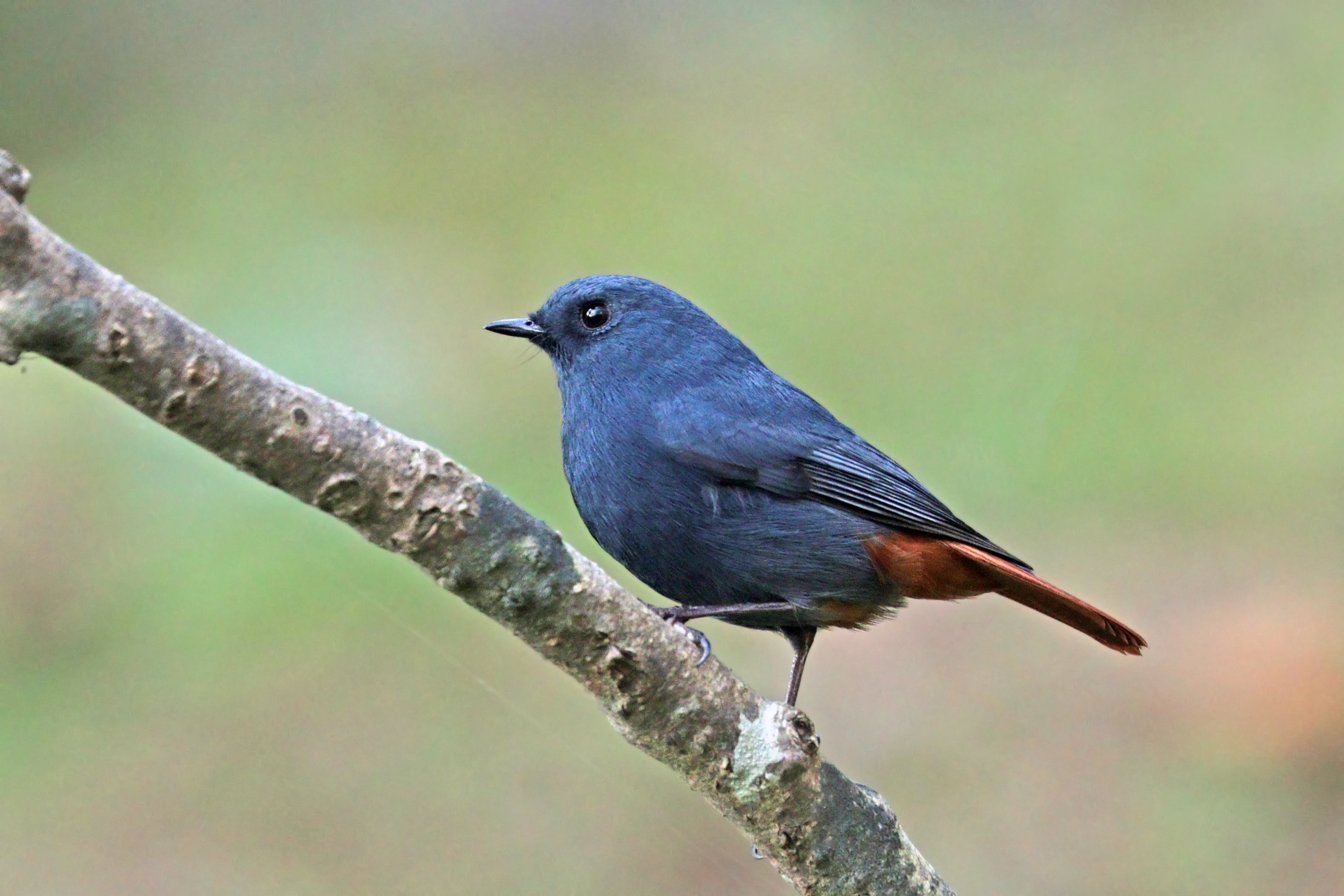
male, Godawari, Lalitpur, Nepal

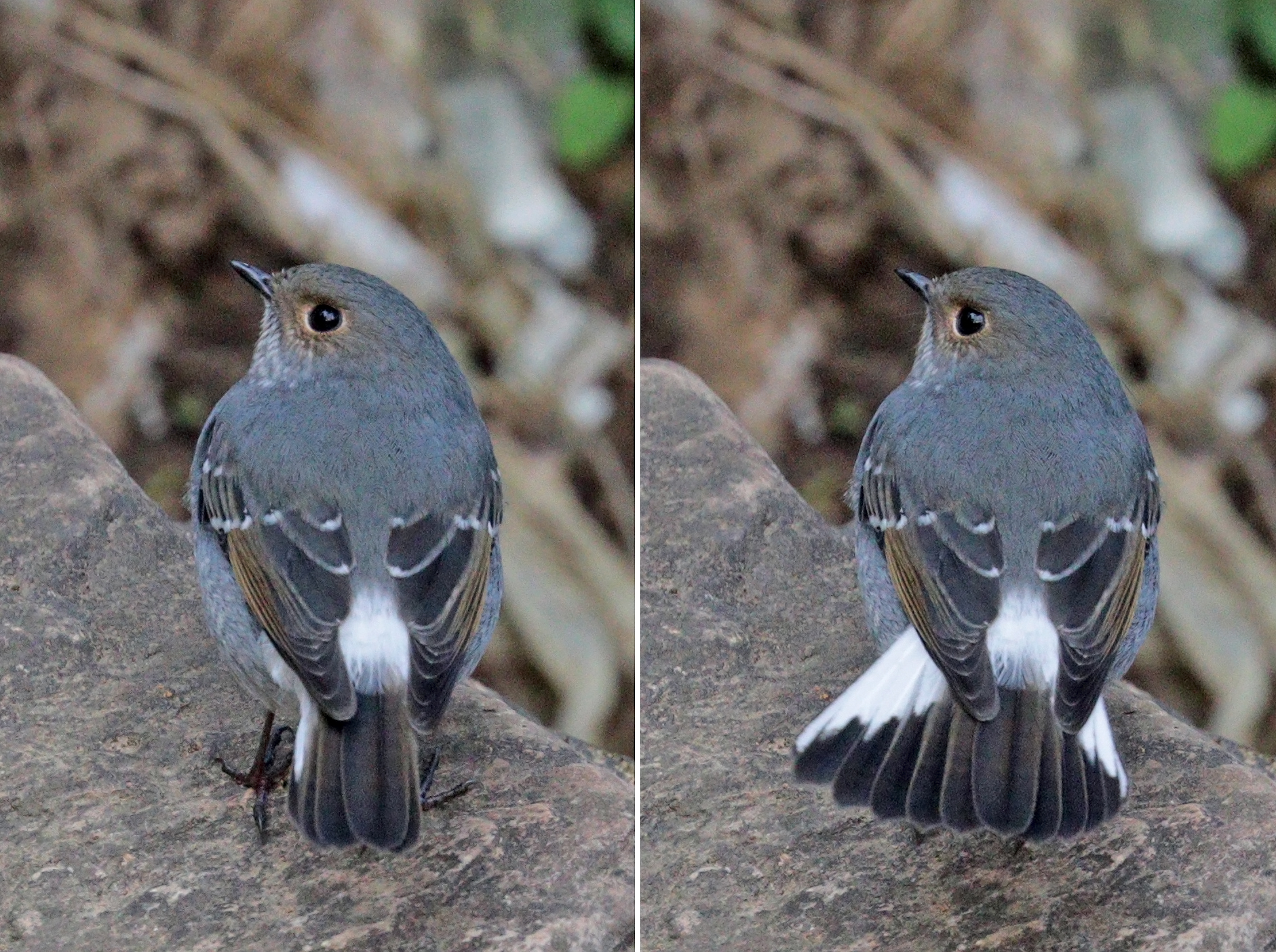
female, showing tail flick

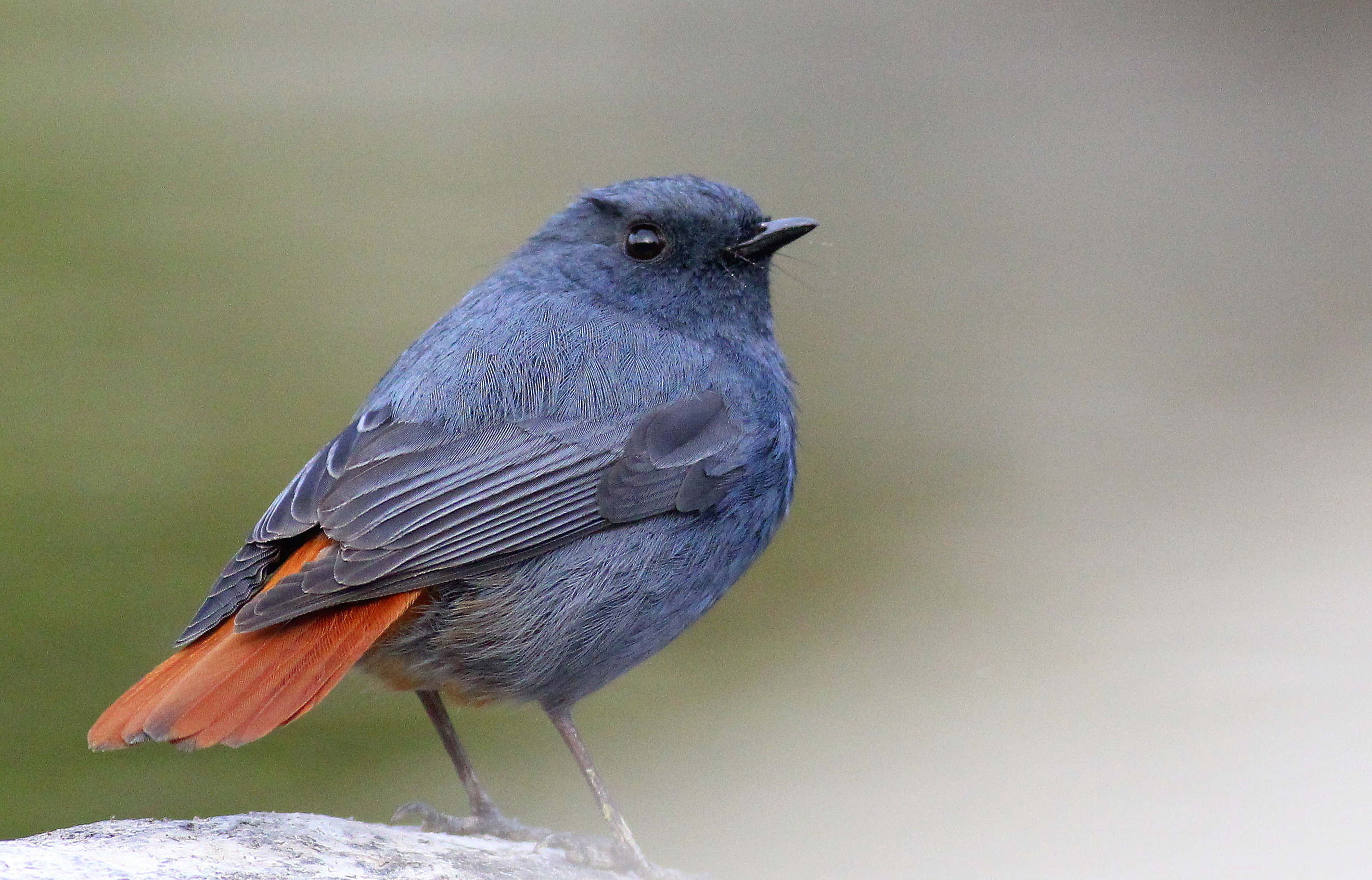
Male, Chaffi, Nainital, Uttarakhand

male calling
