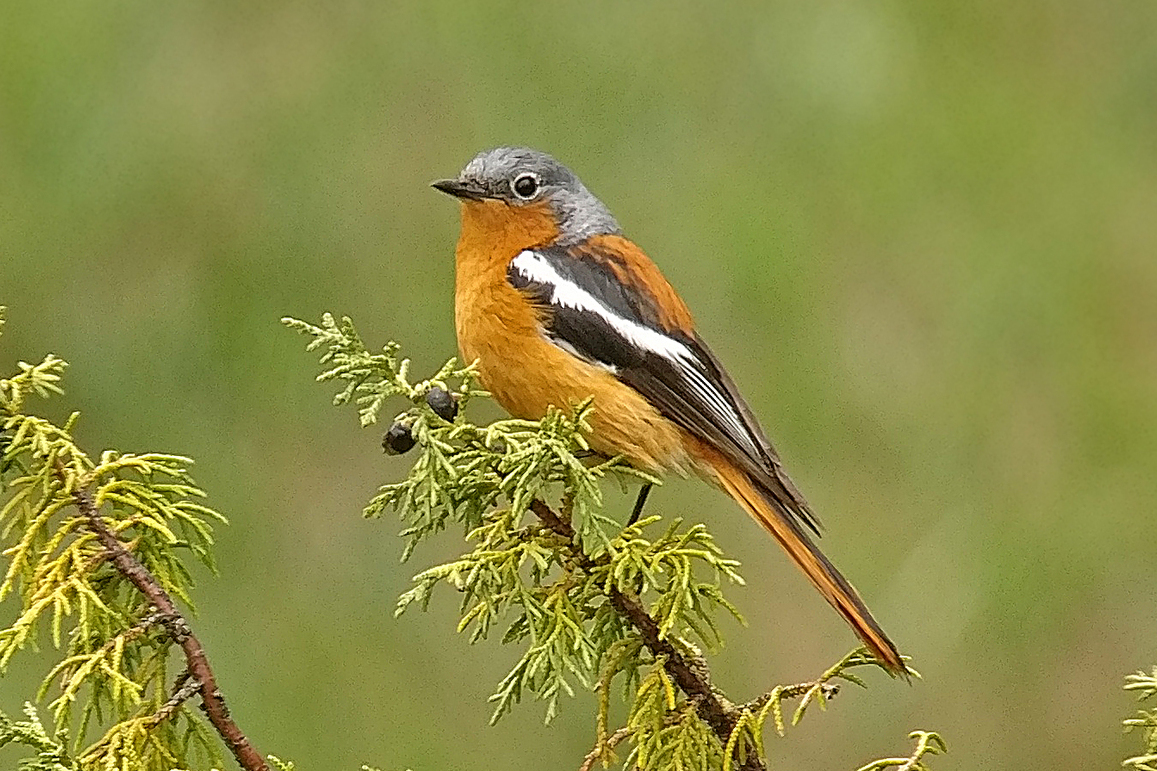
- Ala Shan Redstart (Phoenicurus alaschanicus) in China

Conservation status
- Least Concern (IUCN 3.1)

Scientific classification
- Kingdom: Animalia
- Phylum: Chordata
- Class: Aves
- Order: Passeriformes
- Family: Muscicapidae
- Genus: Phoenicurus
- Species: P. alaschanicus

Binomial name
- Phoenicurus alaschanicus (Przevalski, 1876)

= Przevalski's redstart =

Species of bird

Przevalski's redstart (Phoenicurus alaschanicus), also known as the Ala Shan redstart, is a species of bird in the family Muscicapidae.

Its natural habitat is temperate forests. It is threatened by habitat loss.

== Description ==
It is a medium-sized redstart. The male has a blue-grey crown, nape, sides of the head and upper back. The lower back and tail are orange-brown, as are the breast and throat, while the belly has a pale orange color that is somewhat whitish. The wings are brown with a conspicuous white patch. The central tail feathers are brown. The female has a brown plumage in general. It has darker upperparts. Its underparts are greyish rather than being brownish. Its wings are brown with buff-coloured patches.

Its song consists a rambling series of repeated, rasping, lark-like notes.

== Distribution ==
It is endemic to China, mainly distributed in north-central China. It breeds in Gansu, Qinghai, and Ningxia, possibly including Inner Mongolia, Xinjiang, and Shaanxi as well. It's still unclear where it occurs during the non-breeding season. What is already clear is that it moves from high elevations to low elevations within its year-round range during the non-breeding season. Additionally, it rarely occurs in southern Shaanxi, Hebei, Shanxi, Hubei, Sichuan, and western Beijing.

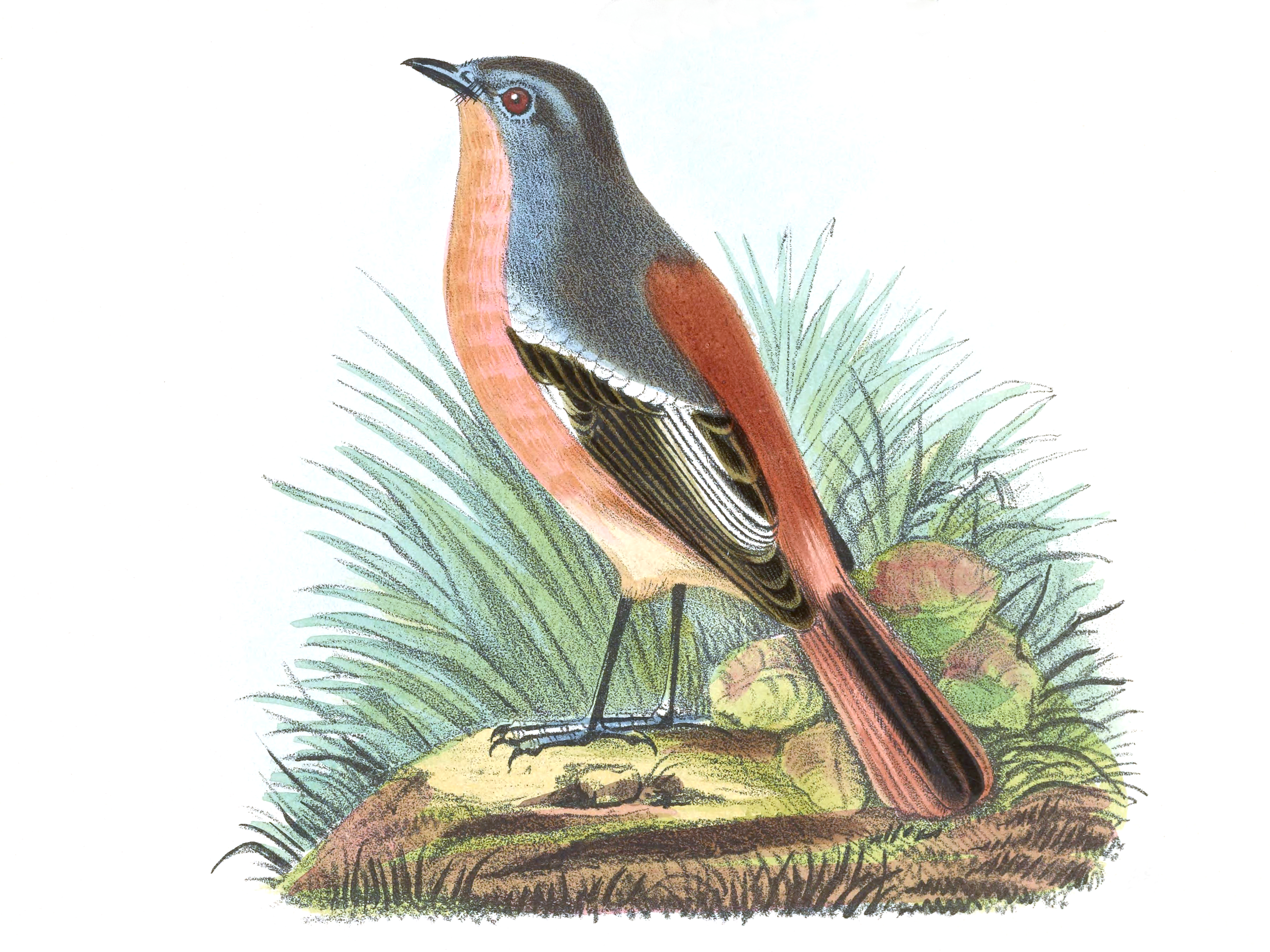
A drawing by Nikolay Przhevalsky
