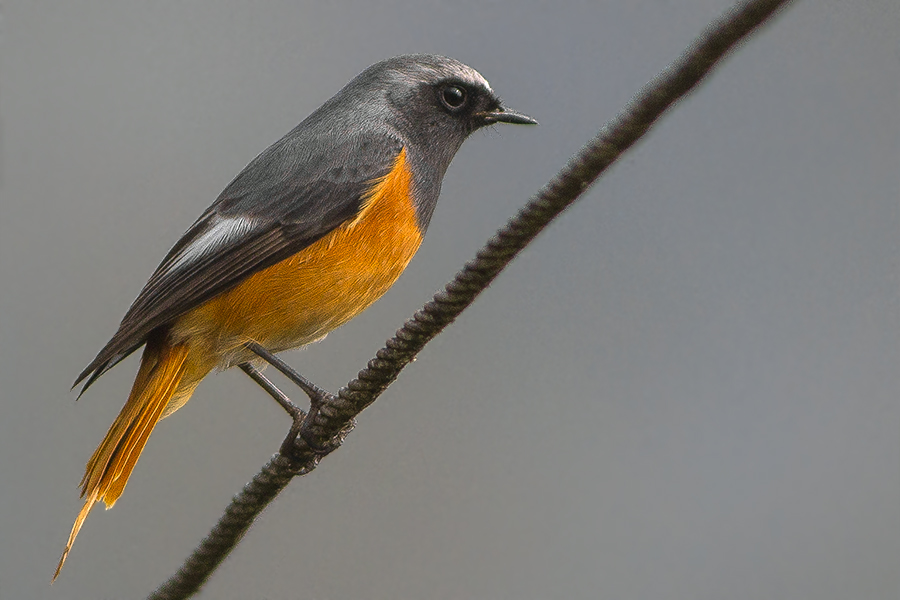
- Male, West Sikkim

Conservation status
- Least Concern (IUCN 3.1)

Scientific classification
- Kingdom: Animalia
- Phylum: Chordata
- Class: Aves
- Order: Passeriformes
- Family: Muscicapidae
- Genus: Phoenicurus
- Species: P. hodgsoni

Binomial name
- Phoenicurus hodgsoni (Moore, F, 1854)

Synonyms
- Ruticilla hodgsoni

= Hodgson's redstart =

Species of bird

Hodgson's redstart (Phoenicurus hodgsoni) is a species of bird in the family Muscicapidae.

It is found in Bhutan, China, India, Myanmar, and Nepal.

Its natural habitat is temperate forests.

It is a winter visitor in the Himalayas.

== Gallery ==
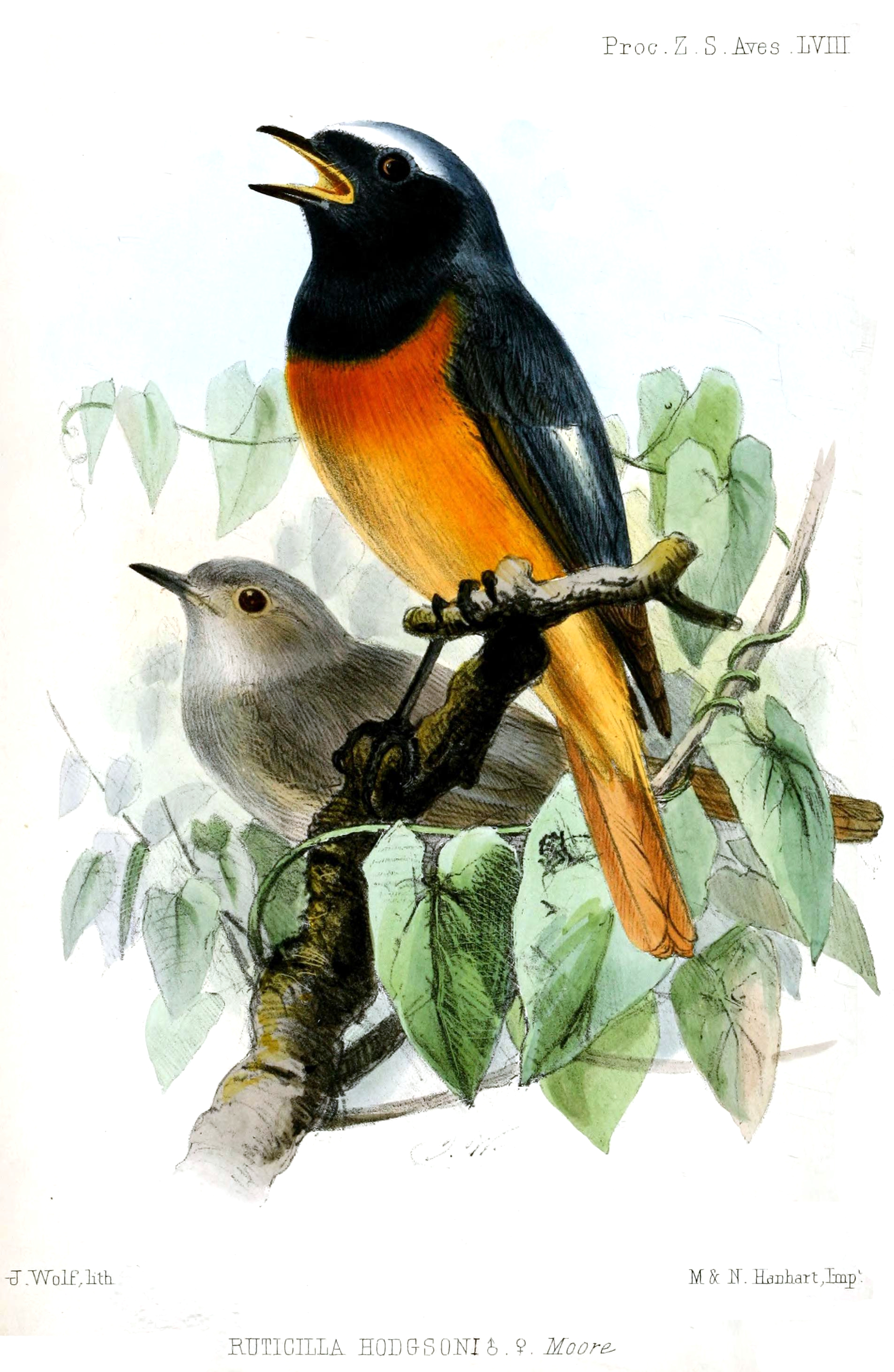
Illustration of Hodgson's redstart by Joseph Wolf (1854)

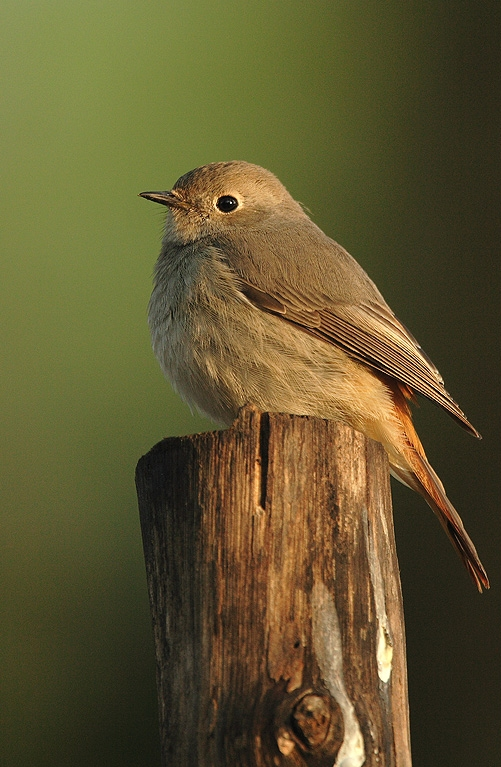
Hodgson's redstart, Manas NP, Assam, India

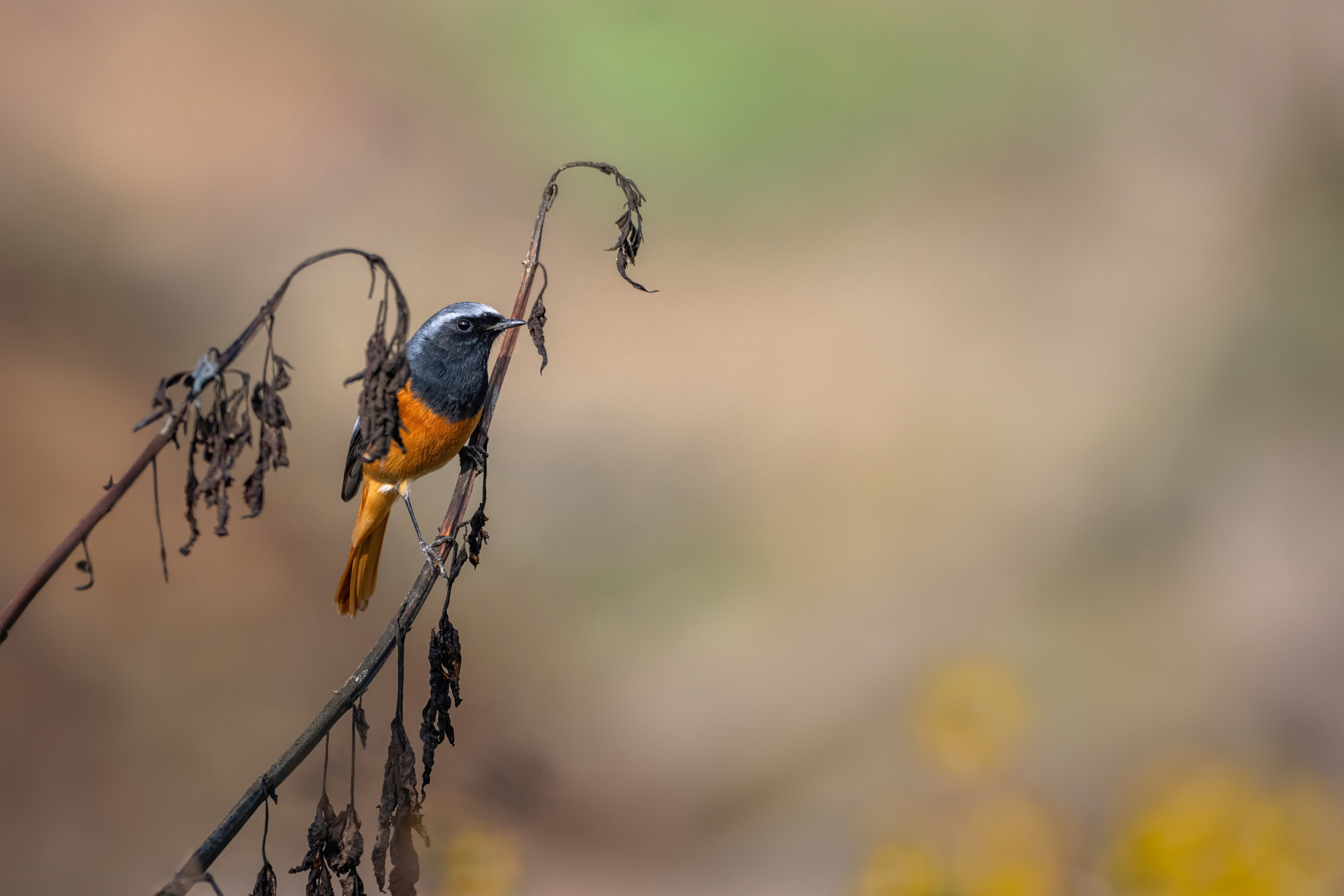
At Sankhu, Kathmandu, Nepal
