= Golden-spectacled warbler =

Golden-spectacled warbler was a common name for birds in the Seicurcus burkii species complex, which included birds now known as:

- Green-crowned warbler (Seicercus burkii)
- Martens's warbler (Seicercus omeiensis)
- Alström's warbler (Seicercus soror)
- Grey-crowned warbler (Seicercus tephrocephalus)
- Bianchi's warbler (Seicercus valentini)
- Whistler's warbler (Seicercus whistleri)
