= Brachypus (disambiguation) =

Brachypus may refer to:

- Brachypus, a genus of plants in the family Brassicaceae
- Brachypus (bird), or Pycnonotus, a genus of birds
- Brachypus (crinoid), or Permobrachypus, a genus of crinoids
