= White-cheeked bulbul =

White-cheeked bulbul may refer to:

- Himalayan bulbul, a species of bird found in central and south Asia
- White-eared bulbul, a species of bird found in south-western Asia
