= Barusan bulbul =

Scientific classification
- Kingdom: Animalia
- Phylum: Chordata
- Class: Aves
- Order: Passeriformes
- Family: Pycnonotidae
- Genus: Pycnonotus
- Species: P. porphyreus

Binomial name
- Pycnonotus porphyreus Oberholser, 1912

Synonyms
- Pycnonotus plumosus porphyreus

Species of bird

The Barusan bulbul (Pycnonotus porphyreus) is a member of the family Pycnonotidae. It is found in western Sumatra and the islands of Nias, Siberut, Batu Islands, Banyak Islands and Sipura. It was described by Harry Church Oberholser in 1912. It is monotypic.

== Taxonomy and systematics ==
This species was formerly considered a subspecies of the olive-winged bulbul, however, it was separated from it based on differences in eye color and vocalizations.

== Description ==
This species is similar to the olive-winged bulbul, but it differs in its eye color; this species has ochre, yellow and orange eyes as compared to the olive-winged bulbul's reddish or brown eyes. It also has an unusual contrast between the olive back and the gray, scaly crown.
