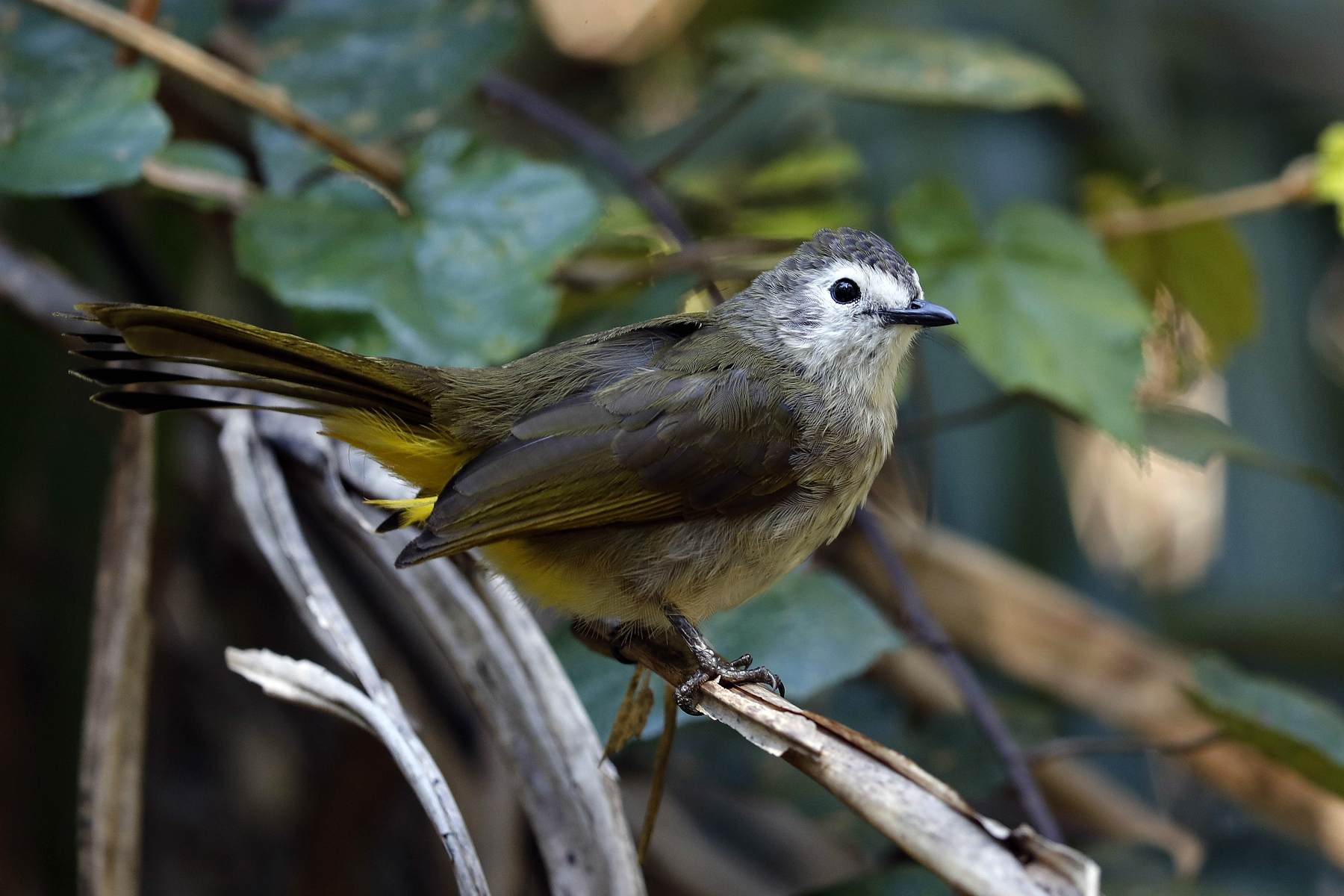

Conservation status
- Least Concern (IUCN 3.1)

Scientific classification
- Kingdom: Animalia
- Phylum: Chordata
- Class: Aves
- Order: Passeriformes
- Family: Pycnonotidae
- Genus: Pycnonotus
- Species: P. leucops

Binomial name
- Pycnonotus leucops (Sharpe, 1888)

Synonyms
- Oreoctistes leucops; Pycnonotus flavescens leucops

= Pale-faced bulbul =

Species of bird

The pale-faced bulbul (Pycnonotus leucops) is a songbird in the bulbul family. It is endemic to the island of Borneo.

== Description ==
At 17.5–19 cm long the pale-faced bulbul is smaller than the flavescent bulbul, with which it was once lumped, which reach 21.5–22 cm in length. Its colouring is mainly brown or grey-brown, darker above than below, with a white or whitish face and throat, and bright yellow undertail-coverts.

== Distribution and habitat ==
The bulbul is found in the mountains of Borneo in montane primary forest, ranging in altitude from about 900 m to 3500 m above sea level.
