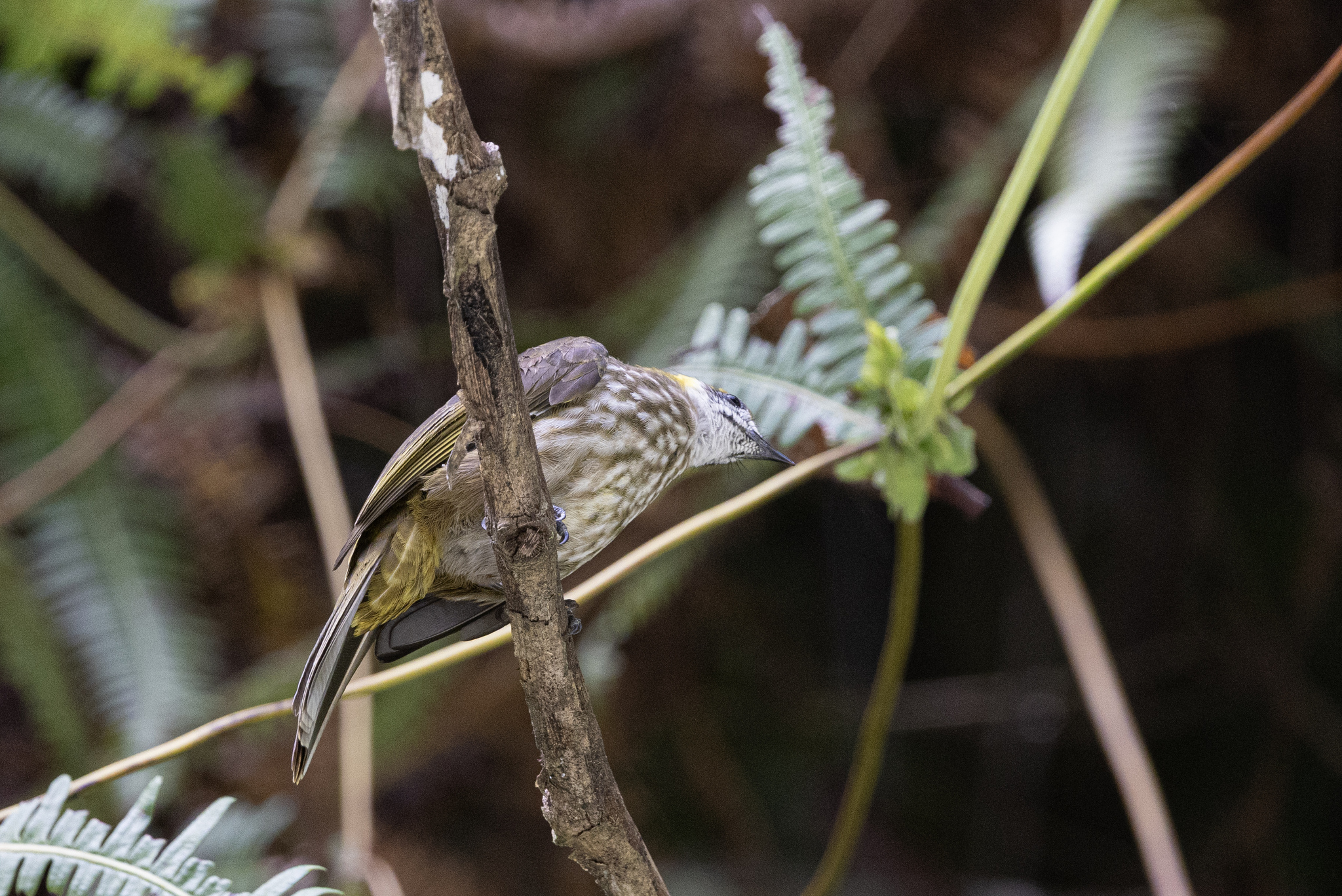

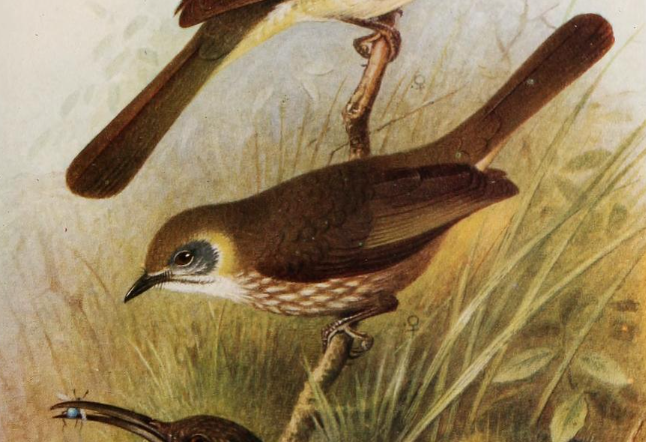

Conservation status
- Least Concern (IUCN 3.1)

Scientific classification
- Kingdom: Animalia
- Phylum: Chordata
- Class: Aves
- Order: Passeriformes
- Family: Pycnonotidae
- Genus: Pycnonotus
- Species: P. tympanistrigus

Binomial name
- Pycnonotus tympanistrigus (Müller, S., 1836)
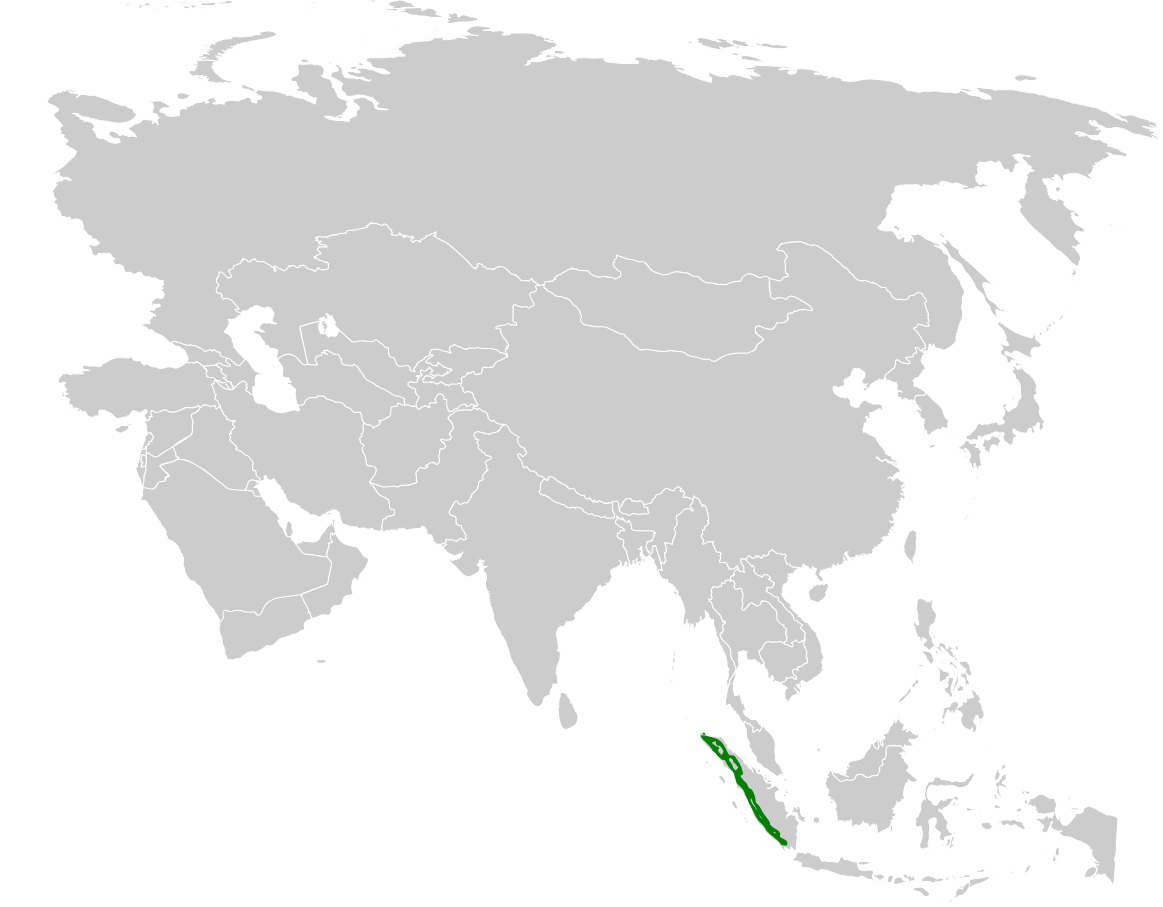

Synonyms
- Pycnonotus tympanistrigus; Ixos tympanistrigus

= Spot-necked bulbul =

Species of songbird

The spot-necked bulbul (Pycnonotus tympanistrigus) is a species of songbird in the bulbul family, Pycnonotidae. It is found in Sumatra. Its natural habitats are subtropical or tropical moist lowland forest and subtropical or tropical moist montane forest. It is threatened by habitat loss. The spot-necked bulbul was originally described in the genus Ixos and later placed in Pycnonotus. Alternate names for the spot-necked bulbul include the olive-crowned bulbul, olive-necked bulbul and small white-streaked bulbul.
