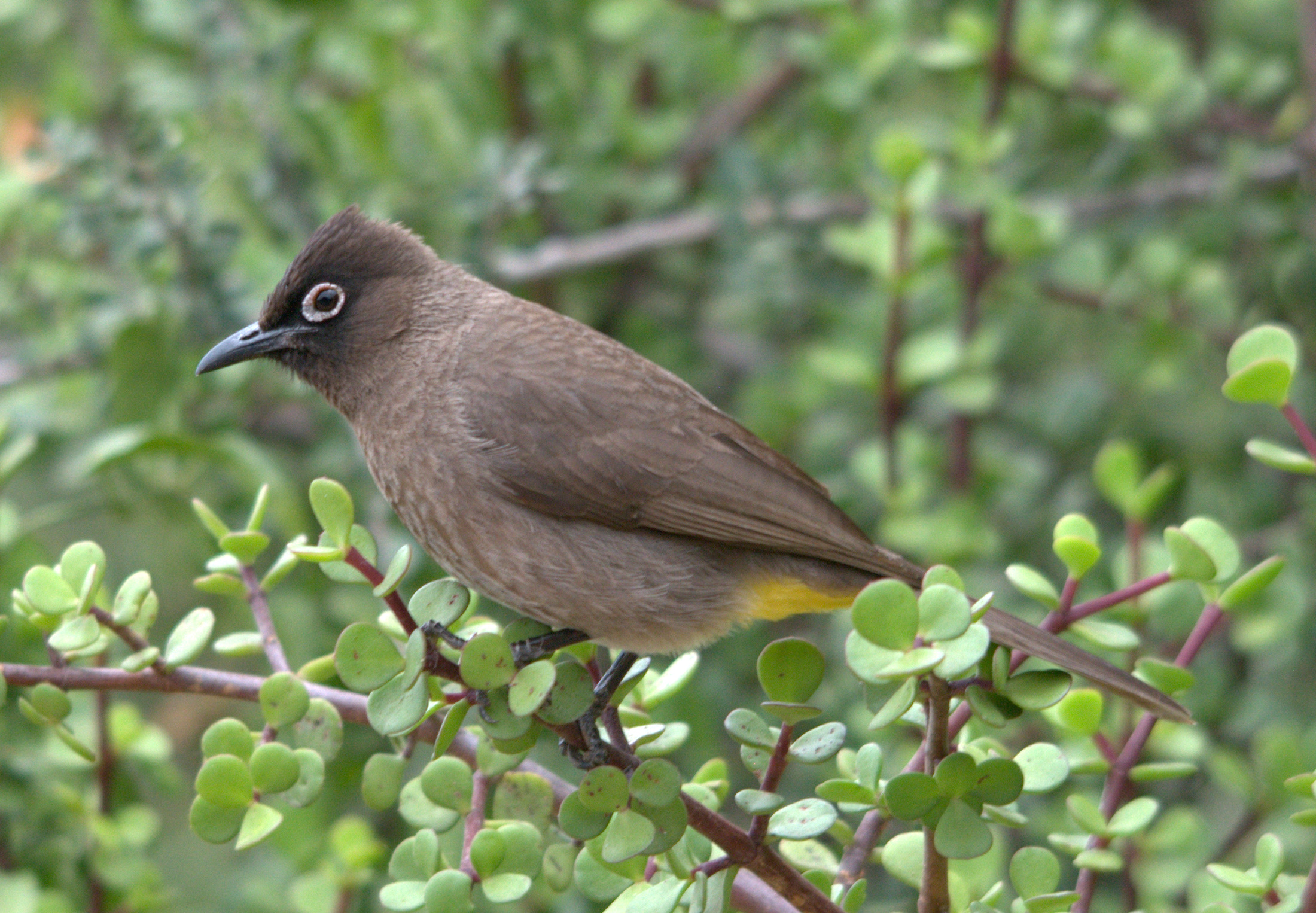
- In Addo Elephant National Park, Eastern Cape, South Africa

Conservation status
- Least Concern (IUCN 3.1)

Scientific classification
- Kingdom: Animalia
- Phylum: Chordata
- Class: Aves
- Order: Passeriformes
- Family: Pycnonotidae
- Genus: Pycnonotus
- Species: P. capensis

Binomial name
- Pycnonotus capensis (Linnaeus, 1766)
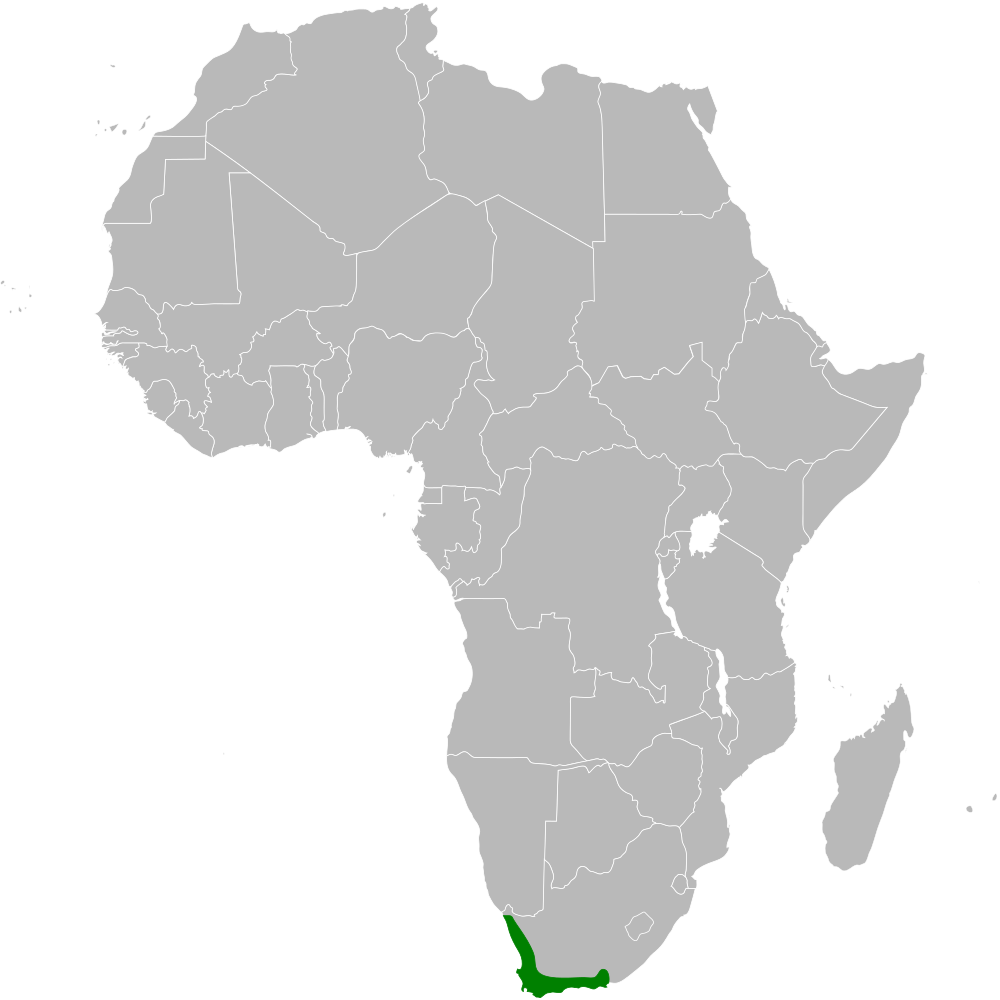

Synonyms
- Turdus capensis Linnaeus, 1766

= Cape bulbul =

Species of bird

The Cape bulbul (Pycnonotus capensis) is a member of the bulbul family of passerine birds. It is an endemic resident breeder in coastal bush, open forest, gardens and fynbos in western and southern South Africa. This species nests mainly in the southern spring from September to November. The nest is a thick-walled cup concealed by foliage in a small tree or shrub.

== Taxonomy ==
In 1760 the French zoologist Mathurin Jacques Brisson included a description of the Cape bulbul in his Ornithologie based on a specimen collected from the Cape of Good Hope in South Africa. He used the French name Le merle brun du Cap de Bonne Espérance and the Latin Merula Fusca Capitis Bonae Spei. Although Brisson coined Latin names, these do not conform to the binomial system and are not recognised by the International Commission on Zoological Nomenclature. When in 1766 the Swedish naturalist Carl Linnaeus updated his Systema Naturae for the twelfth edition, he added 240 species that had been previously described by Brisson. One of these was the Cape bulbul. Linnaeus included a brief description, coined the binomial name Turdus capensis and cited Brisson's work. The specific name capensis denotes the Cape of Good Hope. This species is now placed in the genus Pycnonotus that was introduced by the German zoologist Friedrich Boie in 1826.

The Cape bulbul is considered to belong to a superspecies along with the Himalayan bulbul, white-eared bulbul, white-spectacled bulbul, African red-eyed bulbul, and the common bulbul. Alternate names for the Cape bulbul include the Cape geelgat and two names used for other species (common and dark-capped bulbul).

== Description ==
The Cape bulbul is 19–21 cm (7.5–8.3 in) long, mainly dull, blackish brown with a diagnostic white eye-ring, and yellow undertail coverts. The head has a small crest. The short, straight bill, legs and feet are black and the iris is dark brown. The sexes are similar in plumage.

This species is much darker than the other South African bulbuls, and differs in the eye ring colour and brown lower belly, whereas the other dark bulbuls have a pale lower belly. The dark belly helps to identify juveniles, which lack the distinctive eye ring of the adult.

The most typical call of this species is a liquid whistle of two or more varied notes pit-peet-pitmajol, piet-piet-patata.

== Behaviour and ecology ==
The Cape bulbul is a common and conspicuous bird, which tends to perch at the top of a bush. It is active and noisy, usually seen in pairs or small groups foraging for fruit, nectar and insects.

In part of its range, it gets parasitized by the Jacobin cuckoo.

== Gallery ==
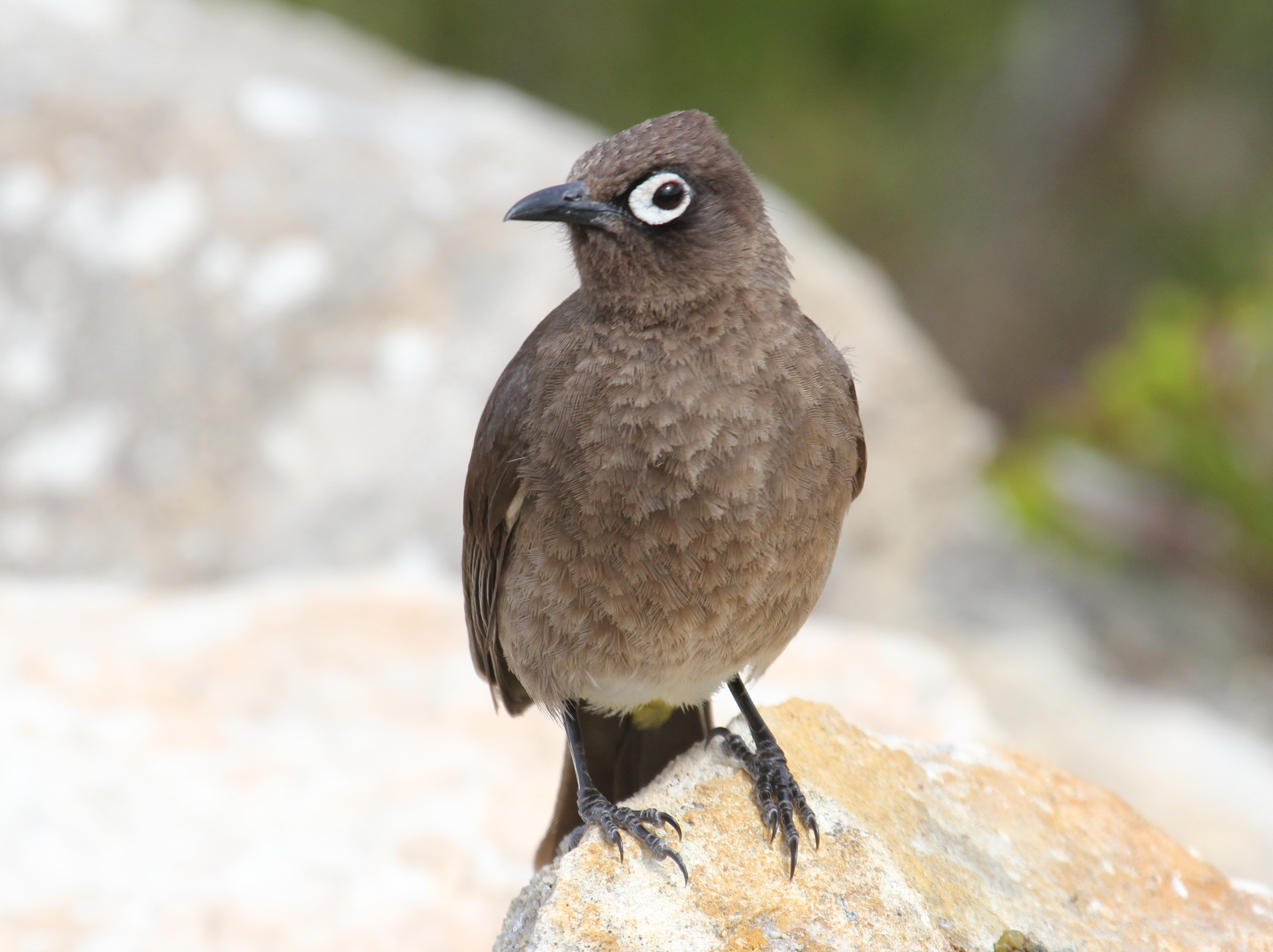

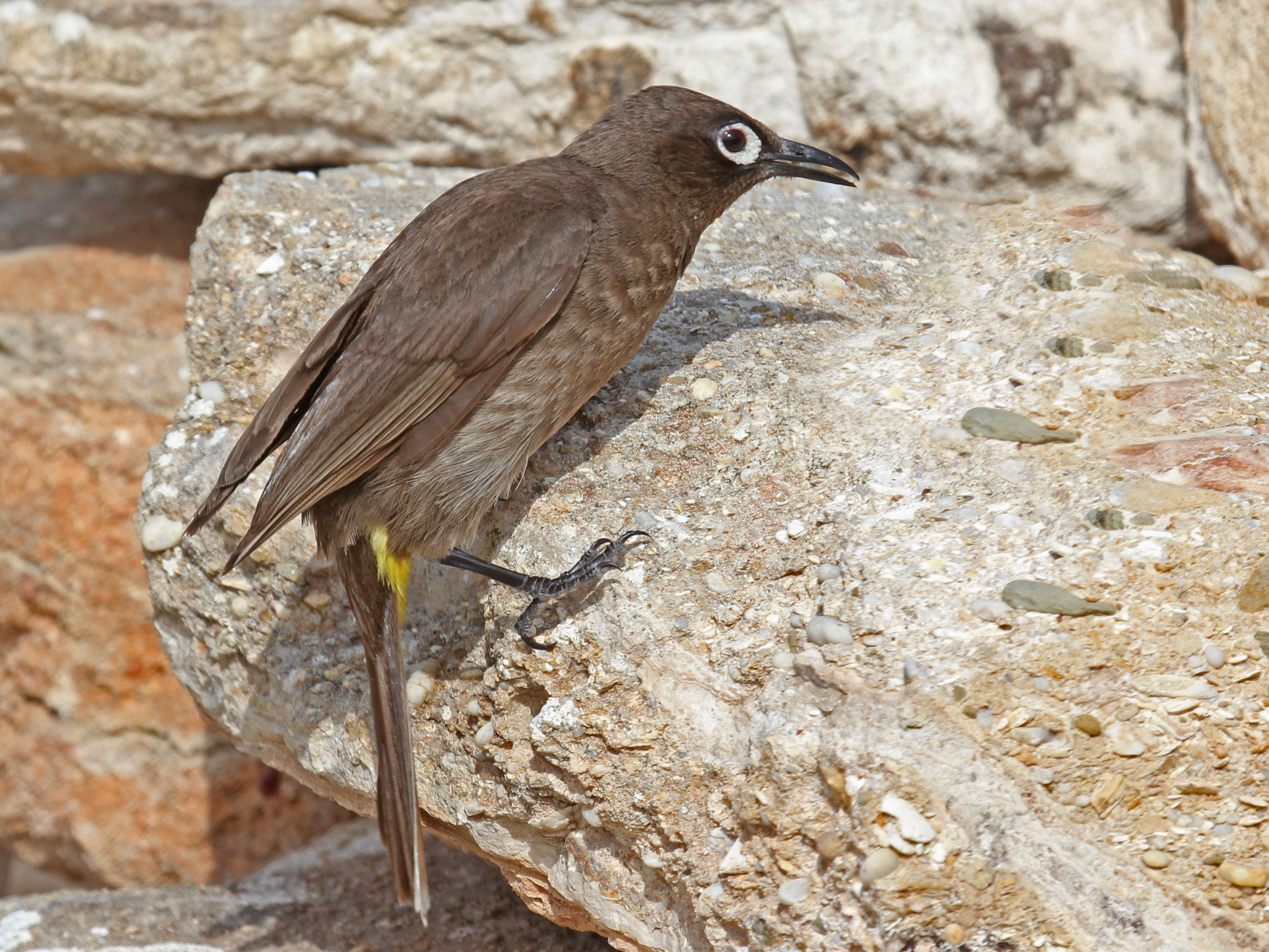

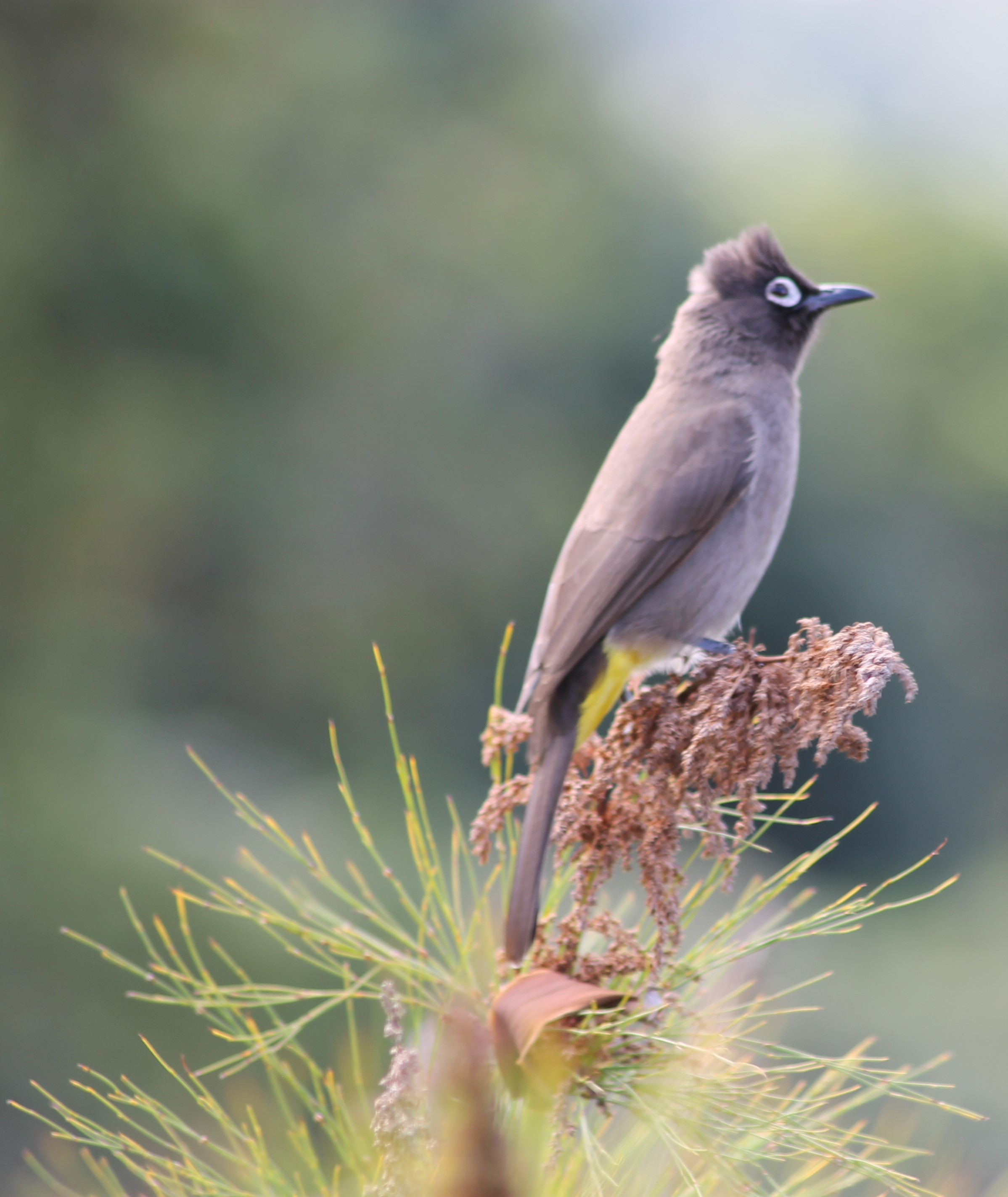
