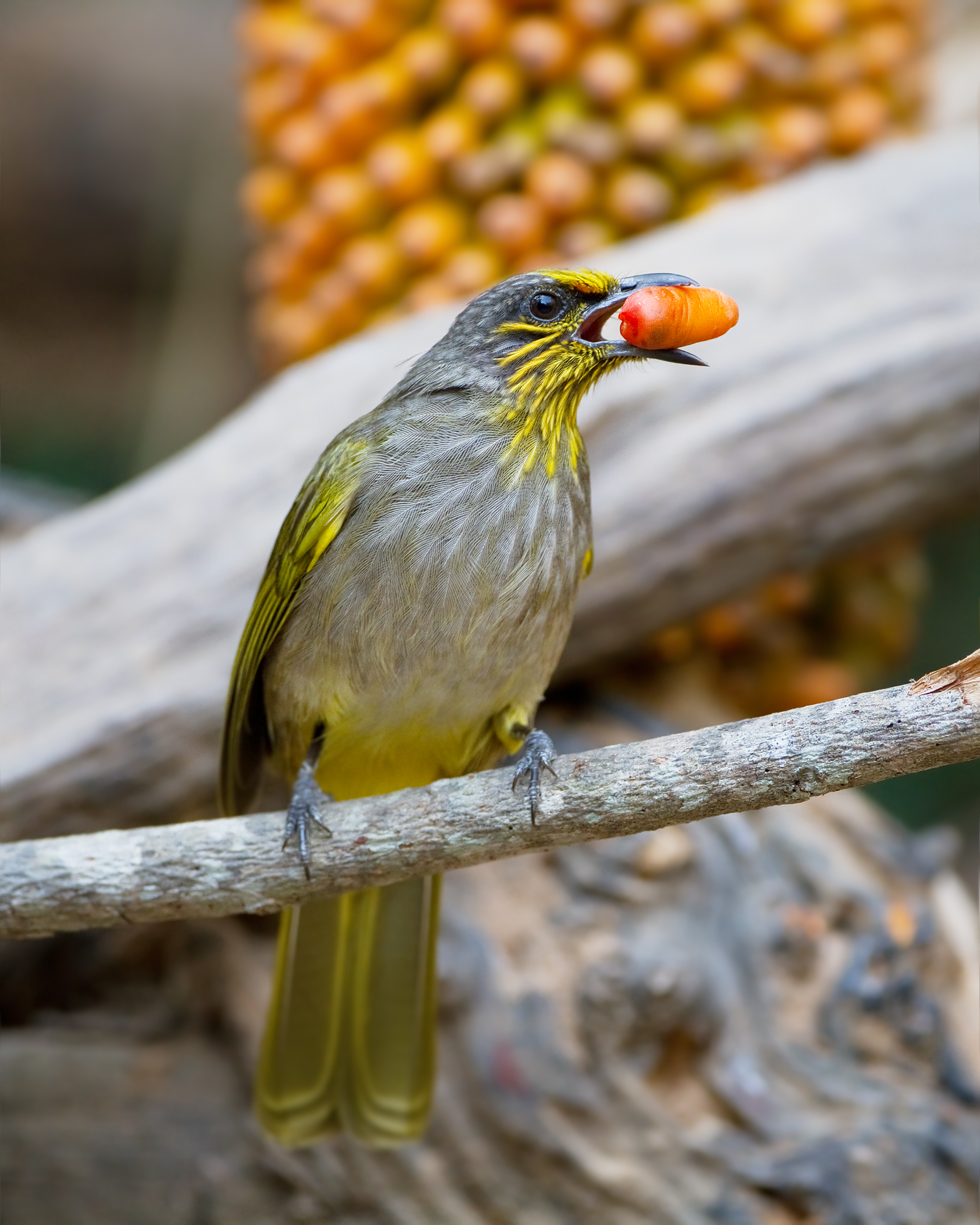
- Song Phi Nong, Kaeng Krachan, Phetchaburi, Thailand

Conservation status
- Least Concern (IUCN 3.1)

Scientific classification
- Kingdom: Animalia
- Phylum: Chordata
- Class: Aves
- Order: Passeriformes
- Family: Pycnonotidae
- Genus: Pycnonotus
- Species: P. finlaysoni

Binomial name
- Pycnonotus finlaysoni Strickland, 1844

= Stripe-throated bulbul =

Species of songbird

The stripe-throated bulbul (Pycnonotus finlaysoni), or streak-throated bulbul, is a species of songbird in the bulbul family of passerine birds. It is found in south-eastern Asia where its natural habitats are tropical moist lowland forest and tropical moist montane forest. It is a common species and the International Union for Conservation of Nature has assessed it as being of "least concern".

== Taxonomy and systematics ==
=== Subspecies ===
Two subspecies are recognized:

- P. f. eous - Riley, 1940: Found in southern China, Thailand and southern Indochina
- P. f. finlaysoni - Strickland, 1844: Found on the Malay Peninsula

== Description ==
The stripe-throated bulbul grows to a length of about 20 cm (8 in). The plumage of both sexes is predominantly dull brown with the exception of the forehead, ear coverts, throat and upper breast which are boldly streaked with yellow. The leading edges of the wings and the outer tail feathers are yellowish, the lower breast and belly are streaked with white, and the area around the vent is yellow. Juveniles are similar to adults but the yellow-colouring is more muted. The song is a rather variable loud, clear sequence of throaty notes.

== Distribution and habitat ==
This bulbul is native to tropical southeastern Asia, where its range includes peninsular Malaysia, Thailand and Vietnam. It is a woodland bird found in secondary forests, thickets, scrubland, clearings and gardens, at altitudes up to about 1,300 m (4,300 ft).

== Ecology ==
The stripe-throated bulbul is omnivorous, foraging for berries and fruits including banyans and Ficus triangularis, and supplementing these with insects which it takes on the wing or on the ground. Breeding takes place between February and September in Malaysia, the nest being cup-shaped, deep and carefully made.

== Status ==
The stripe-throated bulbul has a very wide range estimated to be over 2,000,000 km^{2} (770,000 mi^{2}). The bird is a common species and faces no particular threats, and the population seems to be stable so the International Union for Conservation of Nature has assessed its conservation status as being of "least concern".

== Gallery ==
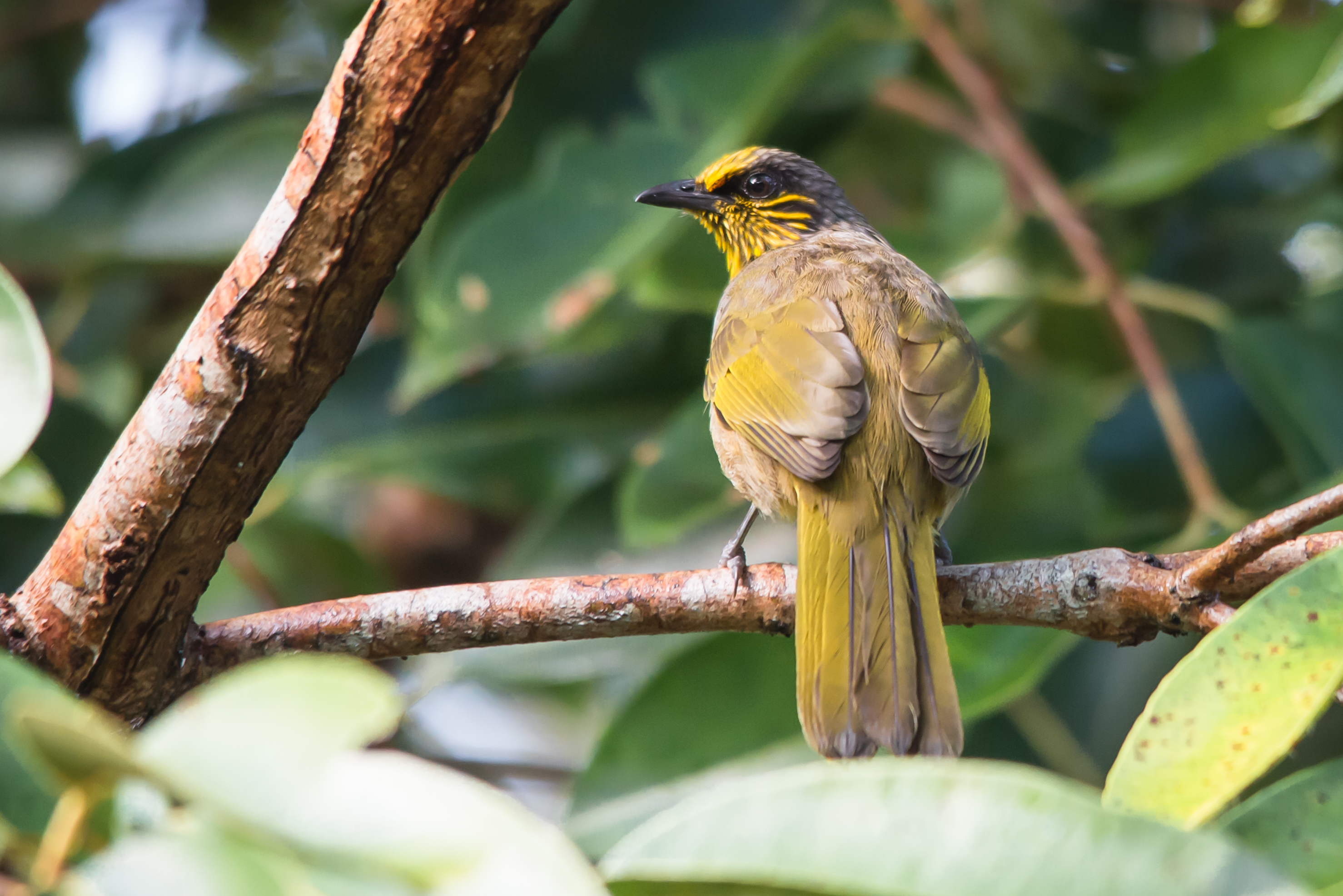
Back view

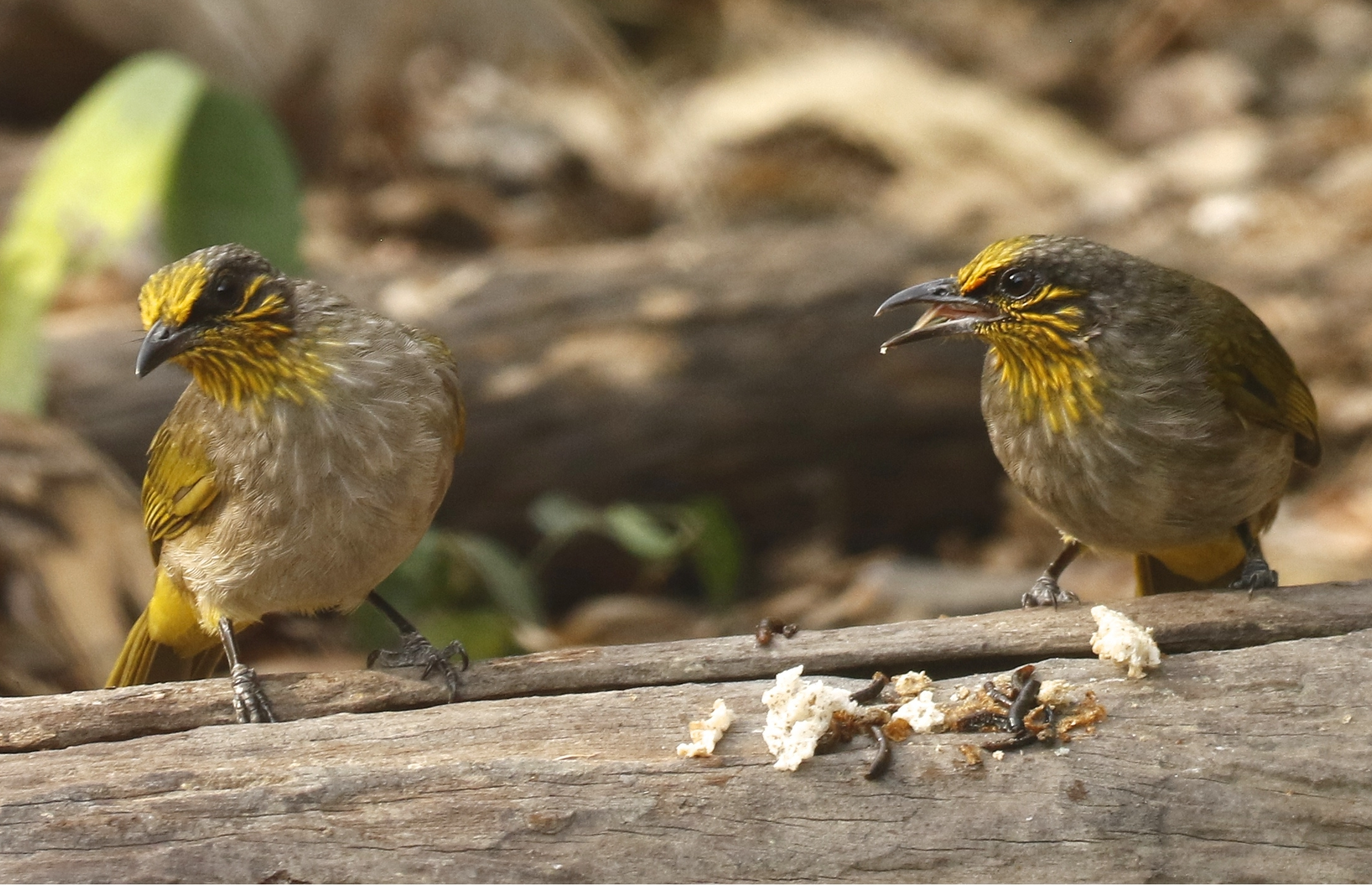
Near Kaeng Krachen Nat'l Park - Thailand
