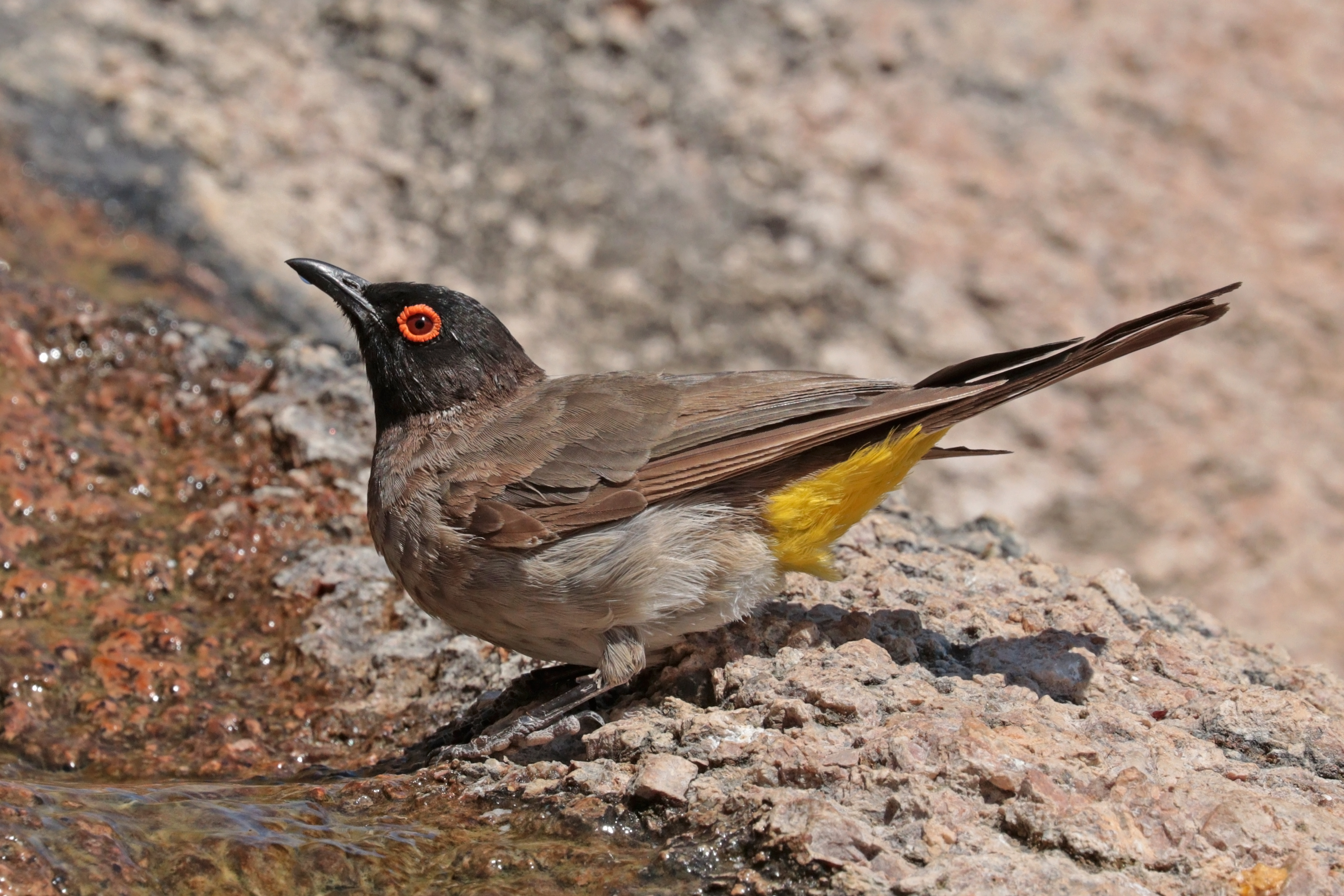
- P. n. nigricans Damaraland, Namibia

Conservation status
- Least Concern (IUCN 3.1)

Scientific classification
- Kingdom: Animalia
- Phylum: Chordata
- Class: Aves
- Order: Passeriformes
- Family: Pycnonotidae
- Genus: Pycnonotus
- Species: P. nigricans

Binomial name
- Pycnonotus nigricans (Vieillot, 1818)
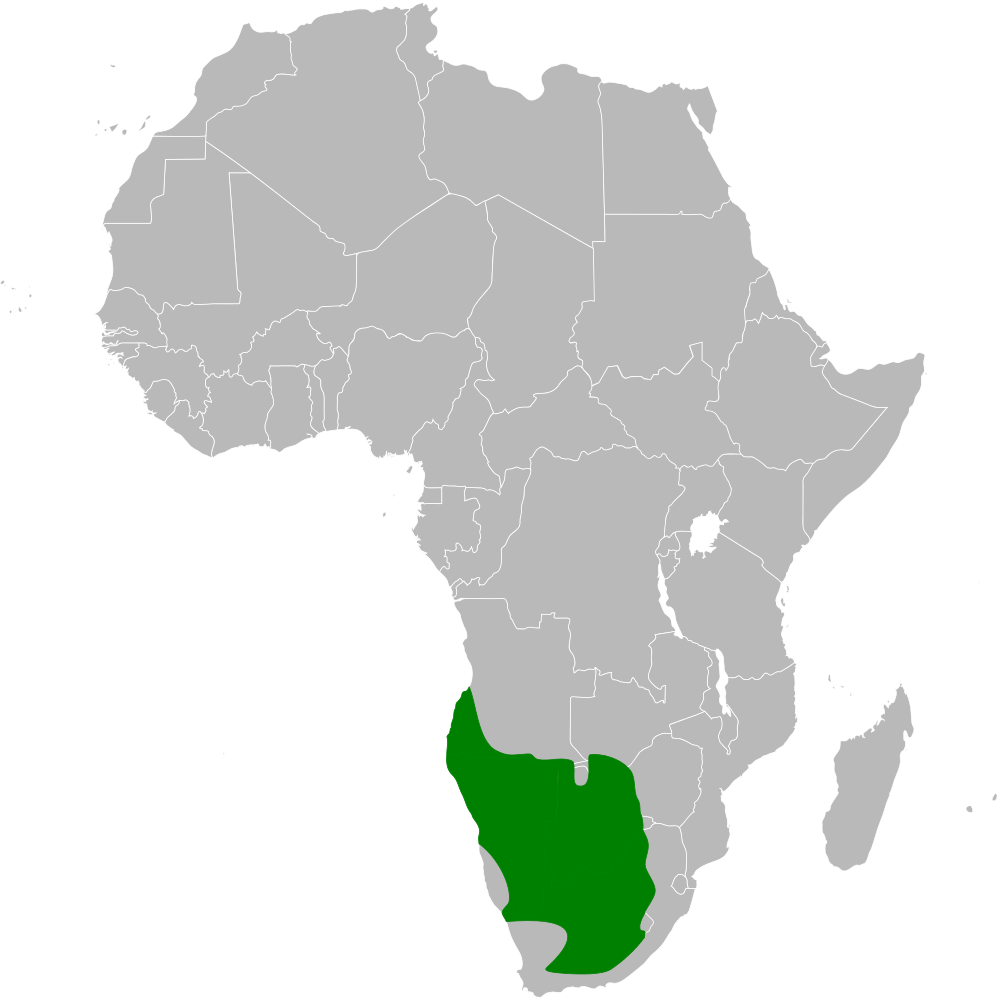
- resident, nomadic and migratory range

Synonyms
- Turdus nigricans

= African red-eyed bulbul =

Species of songbird

The African red-eyed bulbul or black-fronted bulbul (Pycnonotus nigricans) is a species of songbird in the family Pycnonotidae. It is found in south-western Africa. Its natural habitats are dry savanna, subtropical or tropical dry shrubland, and riverine scrub. It feeds on fruit (including Ficus), flowers, nectar, and insects.

== Description ==
The African red-eyed bulbul ranges from 19 to 21 centimeters (7-8 inches) in length and weighs 30-48 grams (1-1.7 ounces). Its call is a series of loud fluty notes, usually given only by the male.

== Taxonomy and systematics ==
The African red-eyed bulbul was originally described in the genus Turdus. The African red-eyed bulbul is considered to belong to a superspecies along with the Himalayan bulbul, white-eared bulbul, white-spectacled bulbul, Cape bulbul, and the common bulbul. The alternate name of 'red-eyed bulbul' is also used by the Asian red-eyed bulbul.

=== Subspecies ===
Two subspecies are recognized:

- P. n. nigricans – (Vieillot, 1818): Found in south-western Angola, Namibia and Botswana and western South Africa
- P. n. superior – Clancey, 1959: Found in central South Africa

== Gallery ==
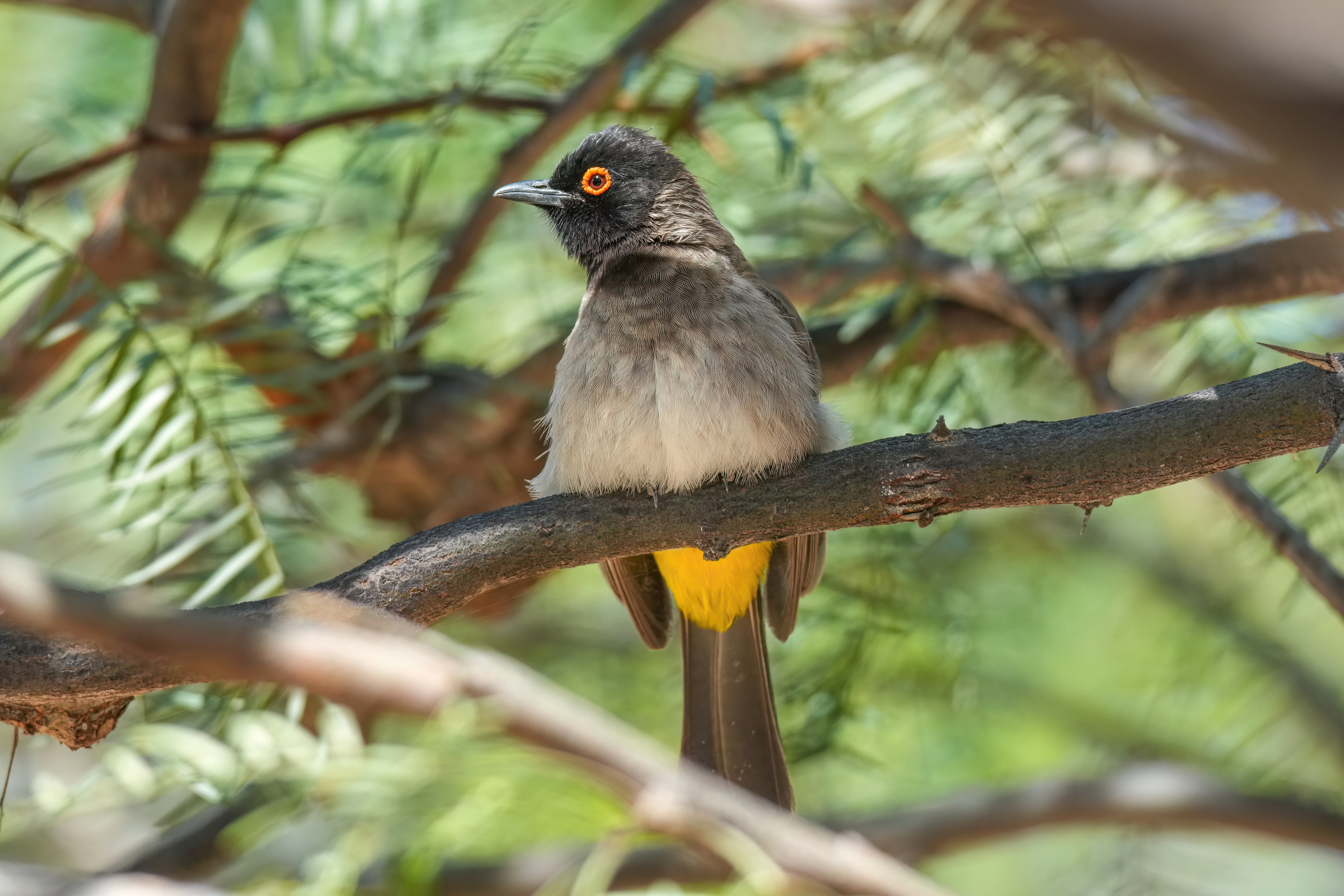
African red-eyed bulbul in Namib-Naukluft National Park, Namibia

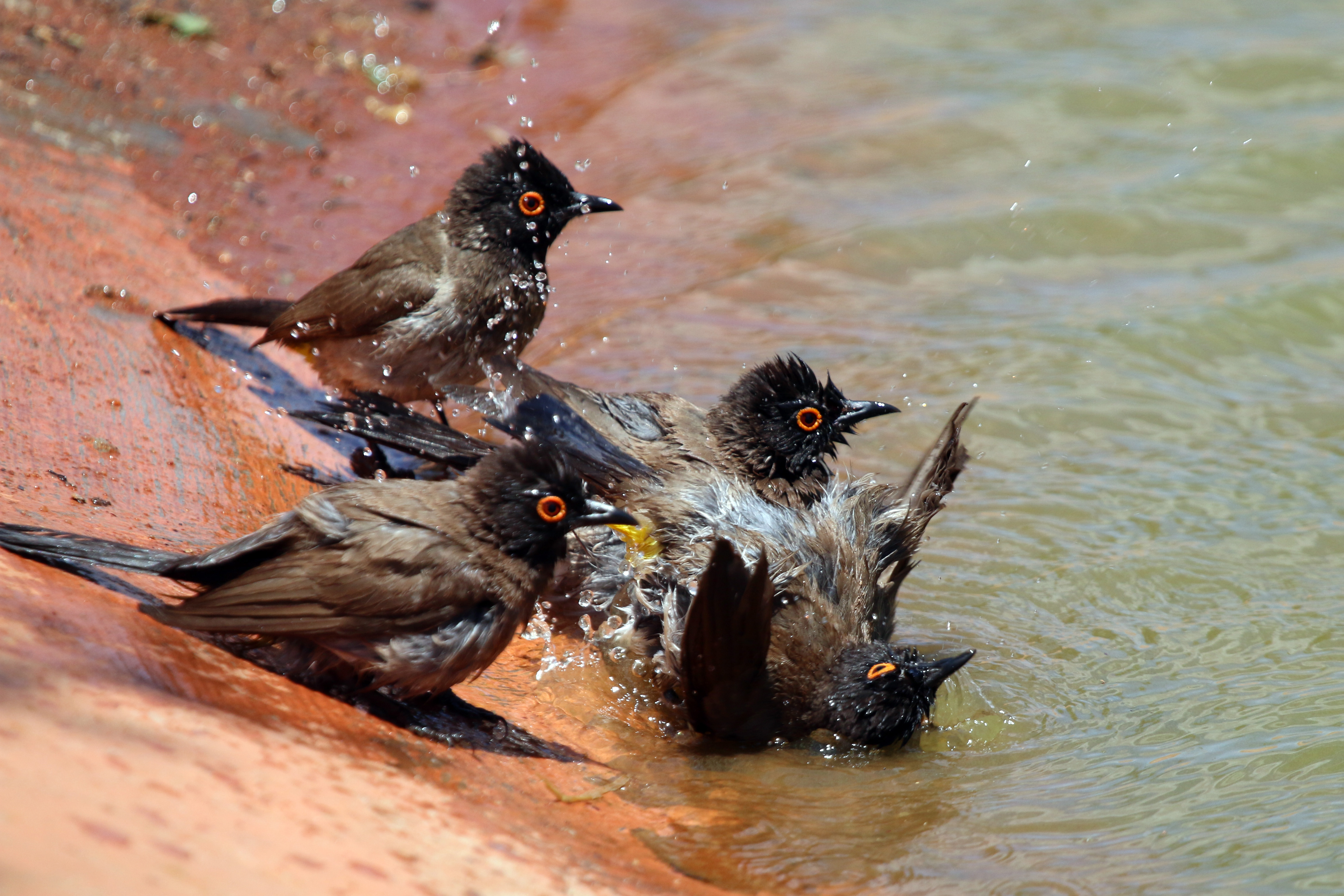
P. n. nigricans; communal bathing at Tswalu Kalahari Reserve, with one or two keeping watch

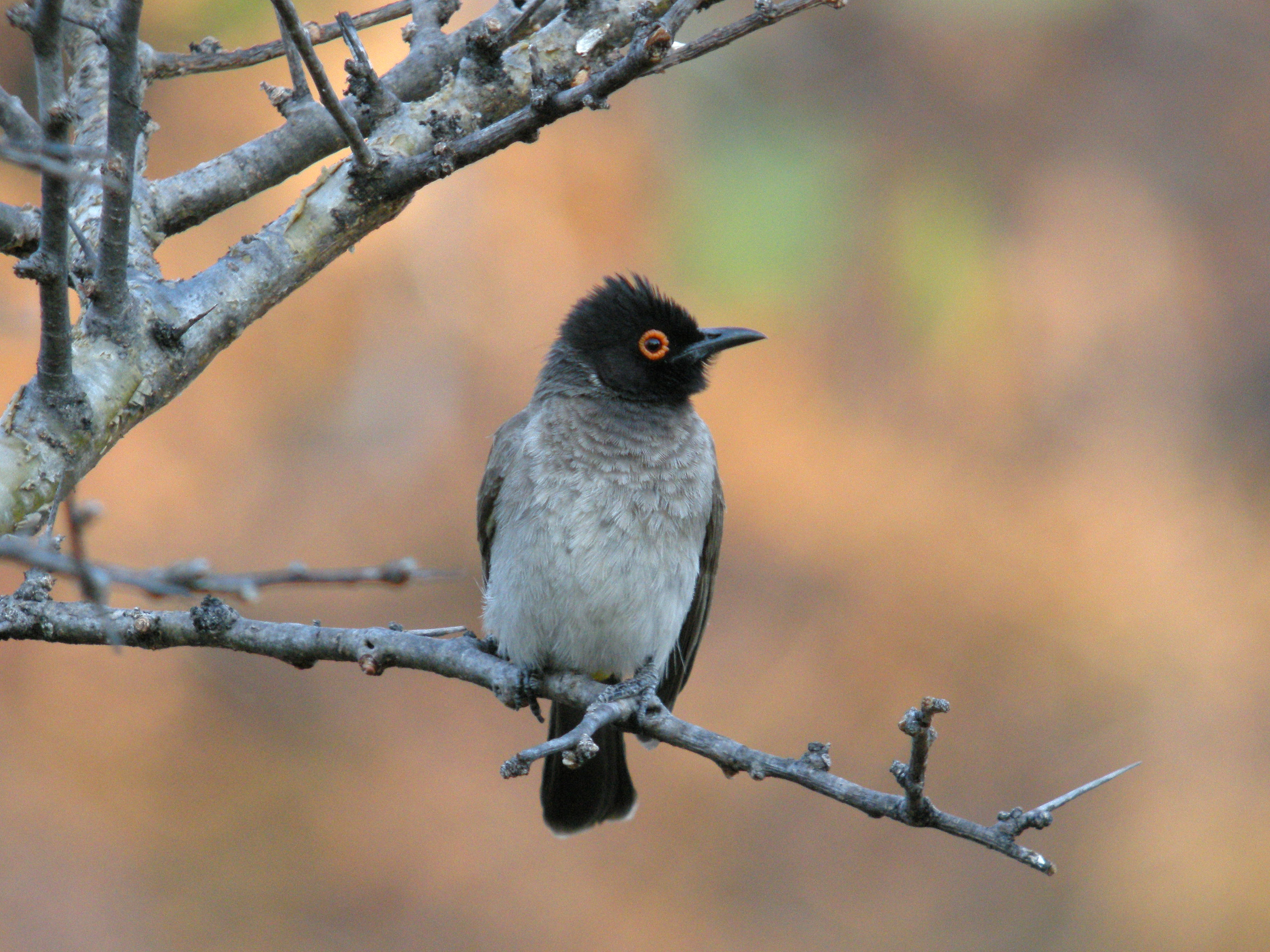
Nominate race at Etosha N. P., showing relatively pale breast plumage

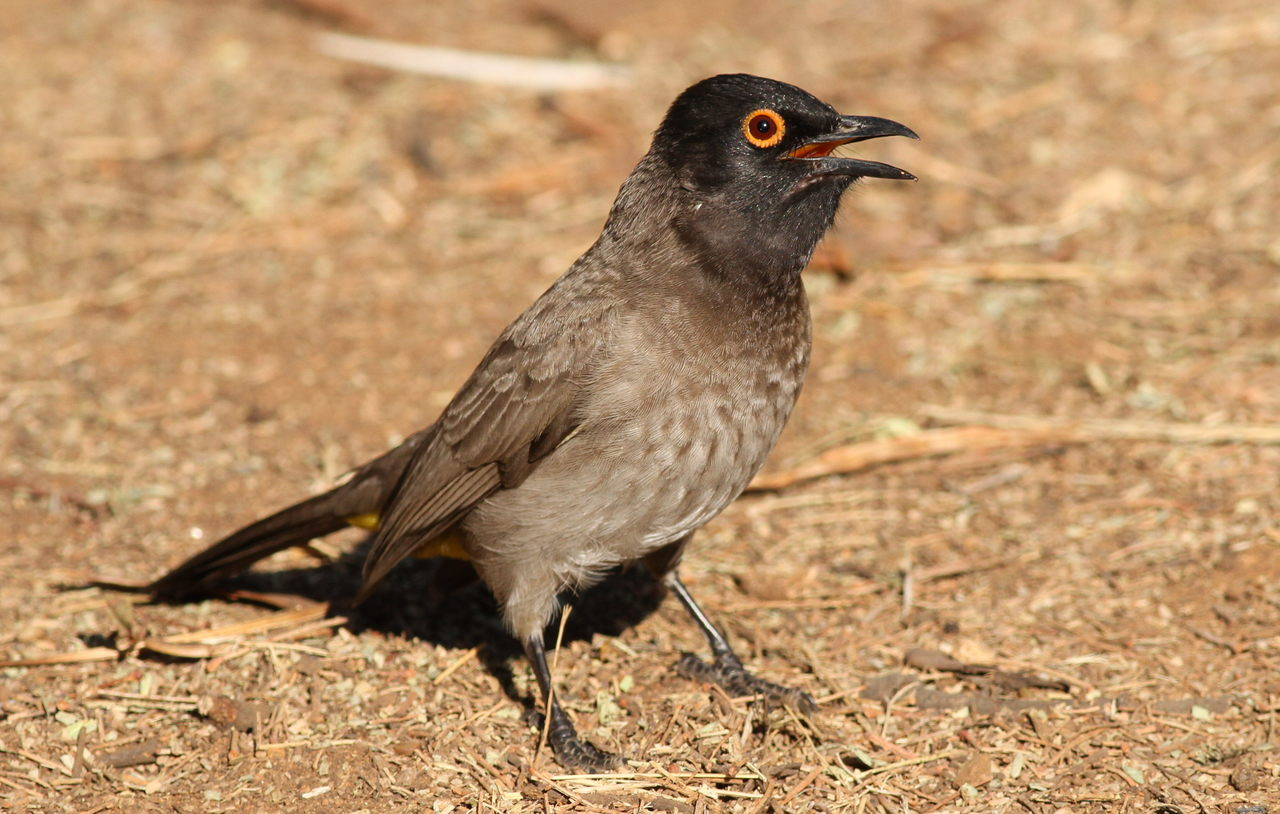
The easterly P. n. subsp. superior, with darker breast and mantle plumage

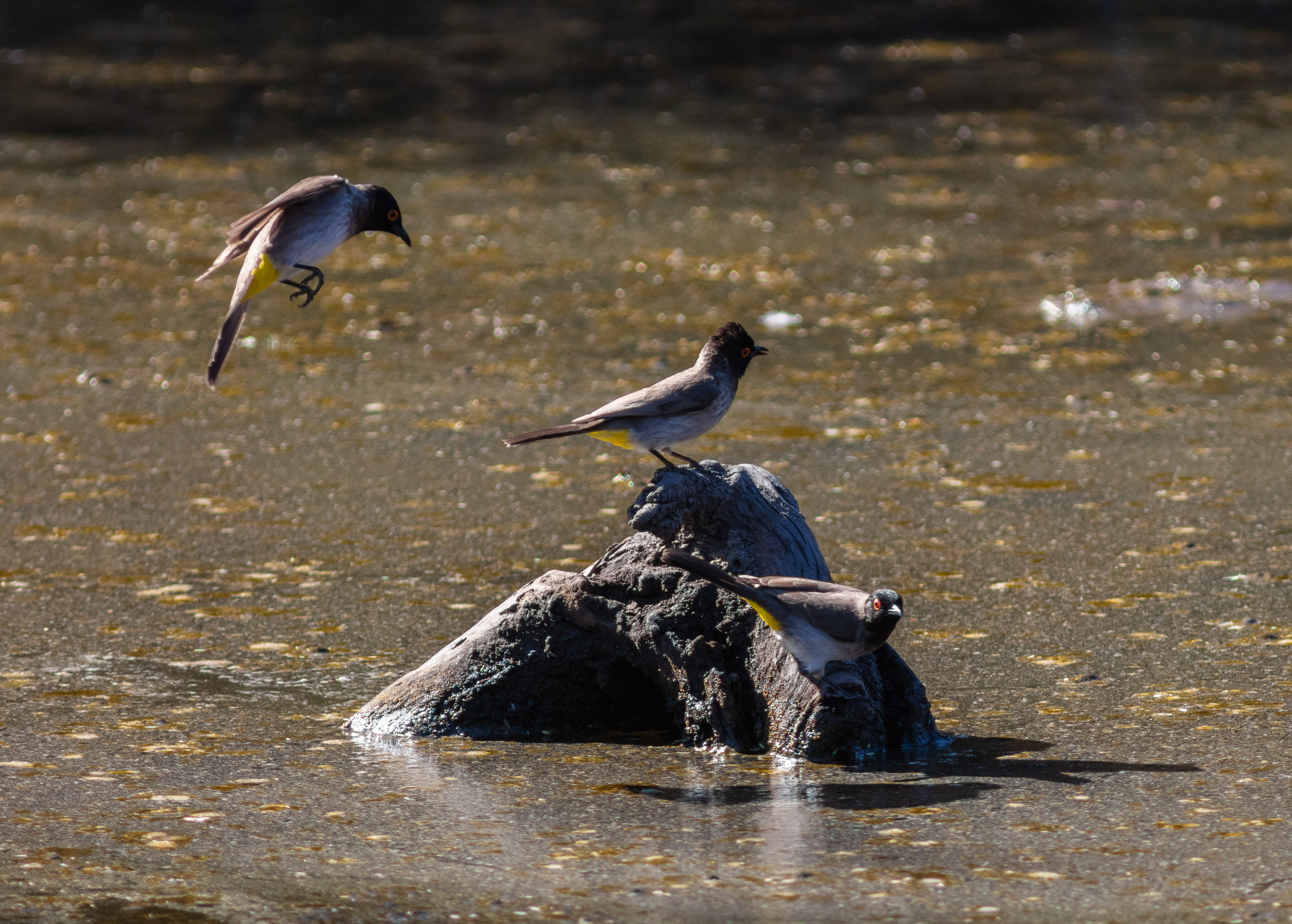
Group of African red-eyed bulbuls in Khama Rhino Sanctuary, Botswana

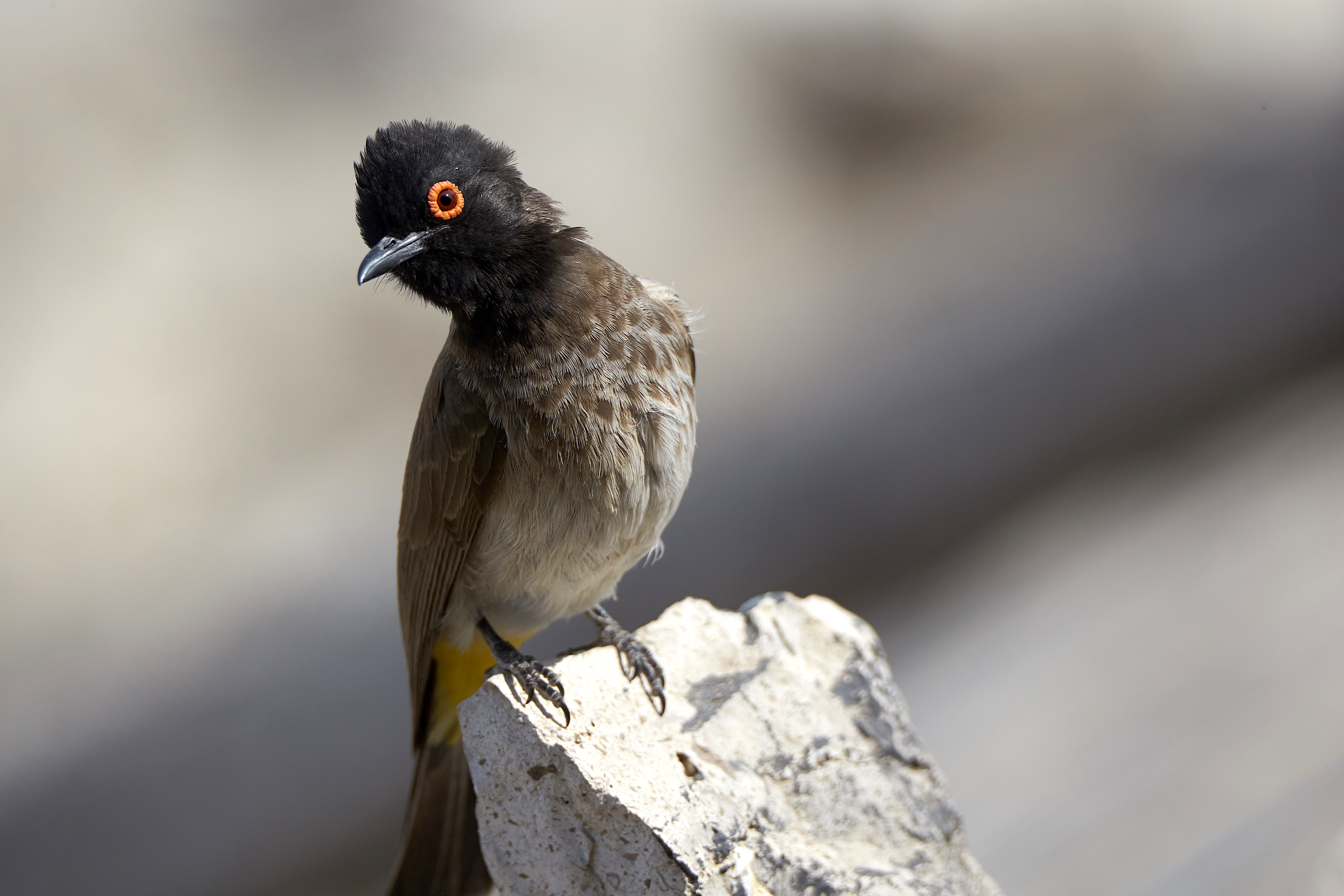
African red-eyed bulbul in Okaukuejo, Etosha National Park, Namibia
