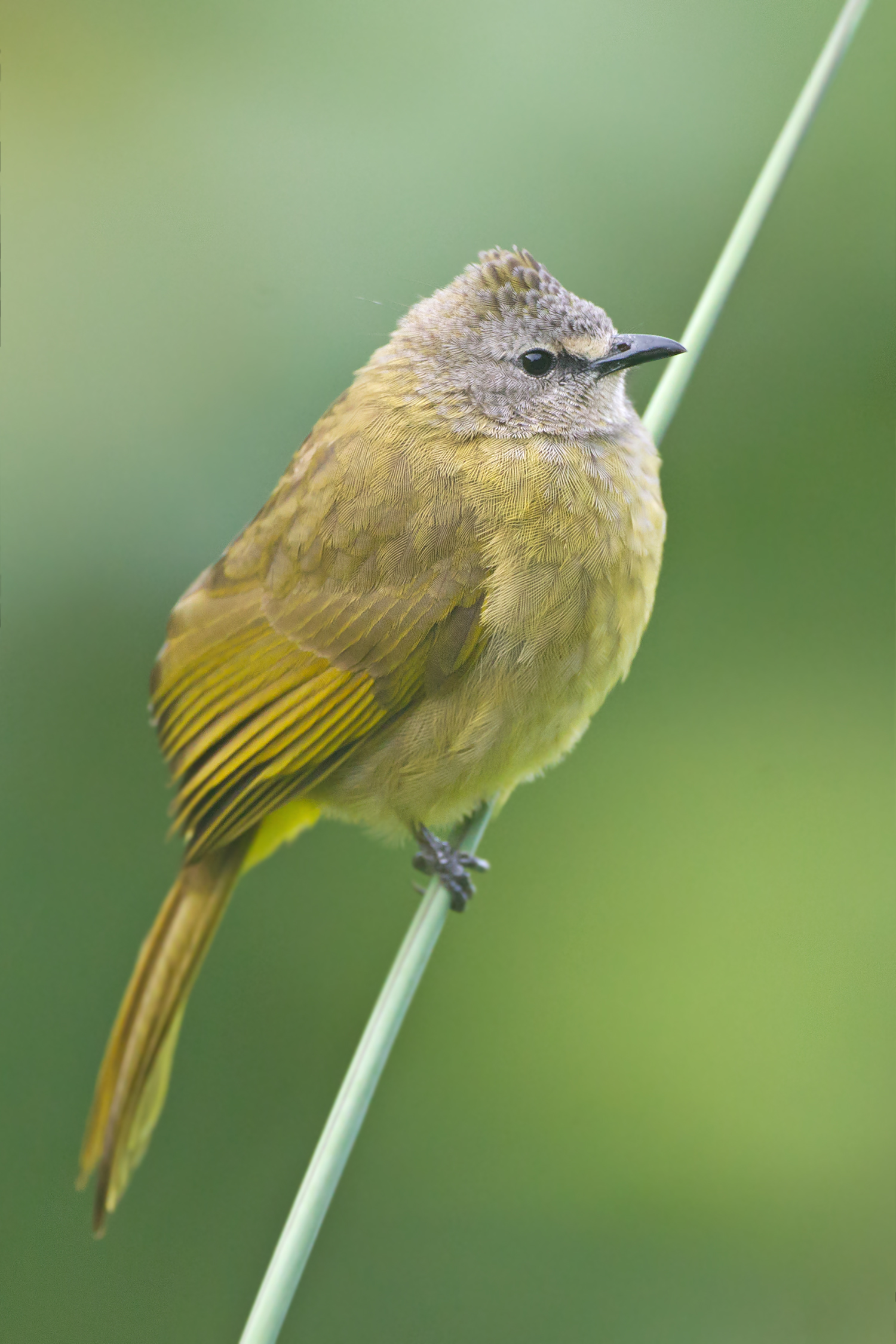
- Flavescent bulbul (Pycnonotus flavescens)

Conservation status
- Least Concern (IUCN 3.1)

Scientific classification
- Kingdom: Animalia
- Phylum: Chordata
- Class: Aves
- Order: Passeriformes
- Family: Pycnonotidae
- Genus: Pycnonotus
- Species: P. flavescens

Binomial name
- Pycnonotus flavescens Blyth, 1845

Synonyms
- Xanthiscus flavescens

= Flavescent bulbul =

Species of songbird

The flavescent bulbul (Pycnonotus flavescens) is a species of songbird in the bulbul family of passerine birds. Its name comes from flavescent, a yellowish colour. It is found in south-eastern Asia.

== Taxonomy and systematics ==
Alternate names for the flavescent bulbul include Blyth's bulbul, flavescent green bulbul and round-tailed green bulbul.

=== Subspecies ===
Three subspecies are recognized:

- P. f. flavescens - Blyth, 1845: Found in north-eastern India, north-eastern Bangladesh and western Myanmar
- P. f. vividus - (Baker, ECS, 1917): Found in north-eastern Myanmar, southern China, Thailand and northern Indochina
- P. f. sordidus - (Robinson & Kloss, 1919): Found in southern Indochina

== Distribution and habitat ==
The natural habitat of the flavescent bulbul is subtropical or tropical moist montane forests.

== Gallery ==
Flavescent bulbul in Kaeng Krachan National Park, Thailand

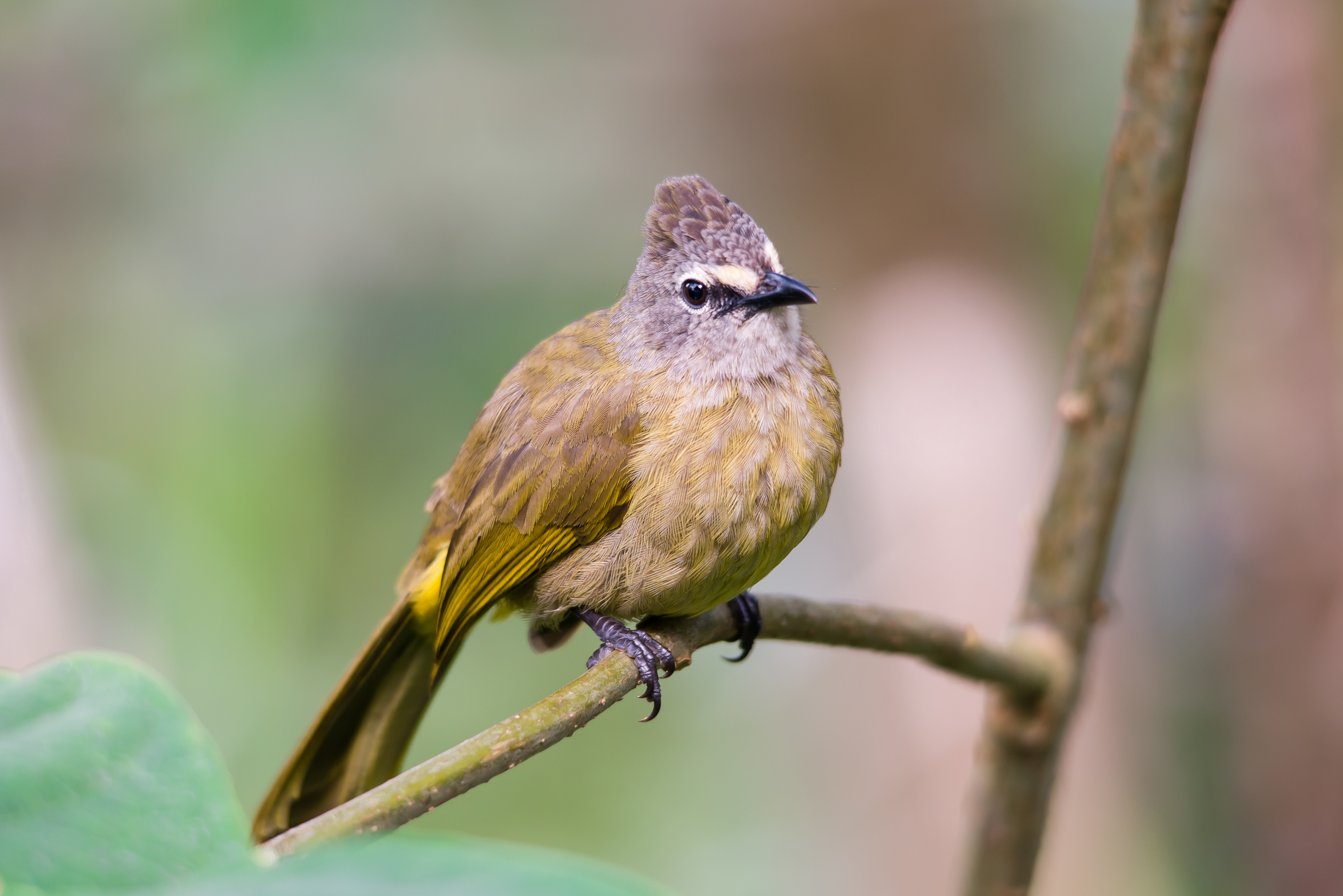
Flavescent bulbul in Kaeng Krachan National Park, Thailand

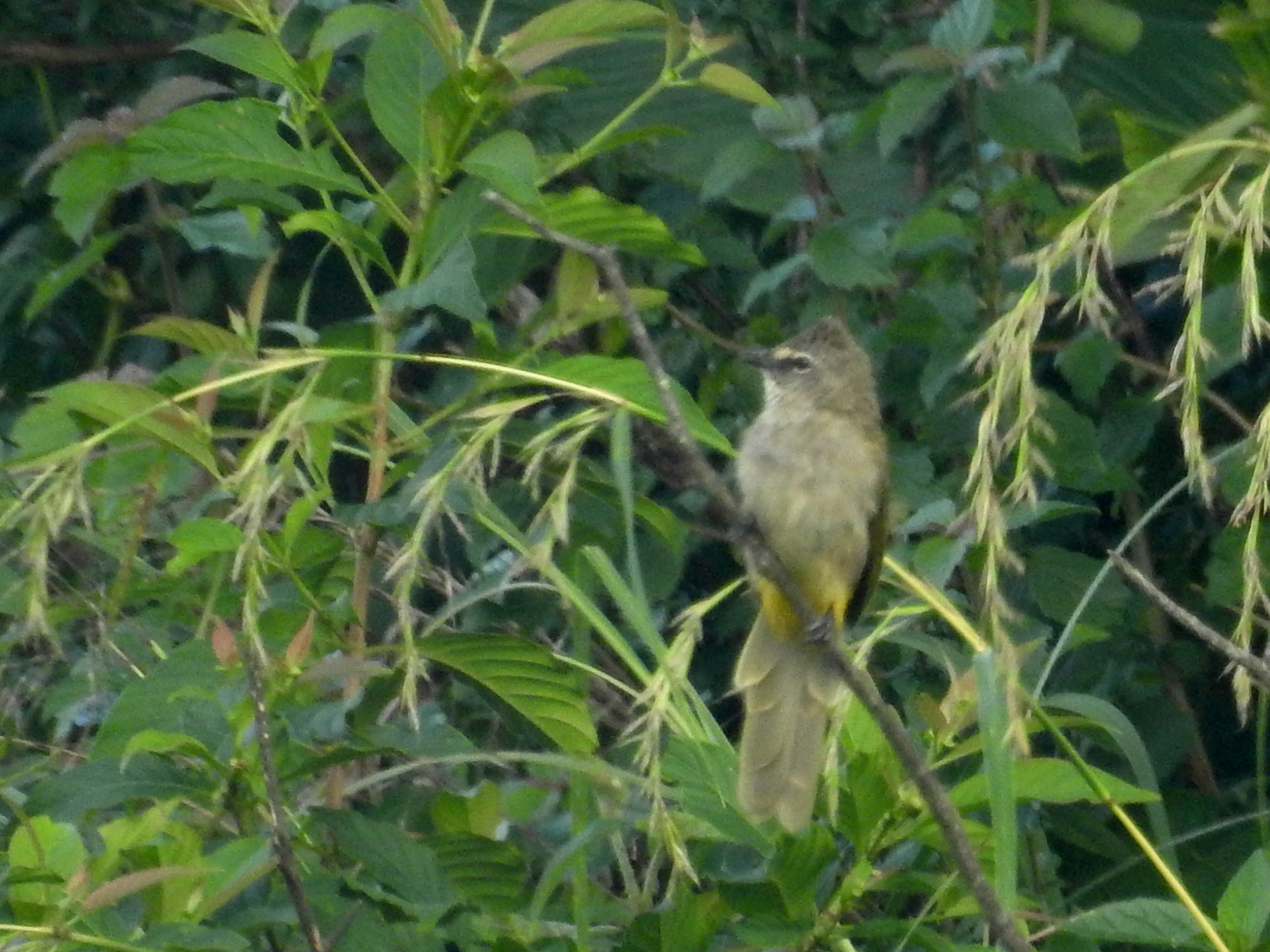
Flavescent bulbul in Mizoram, India
