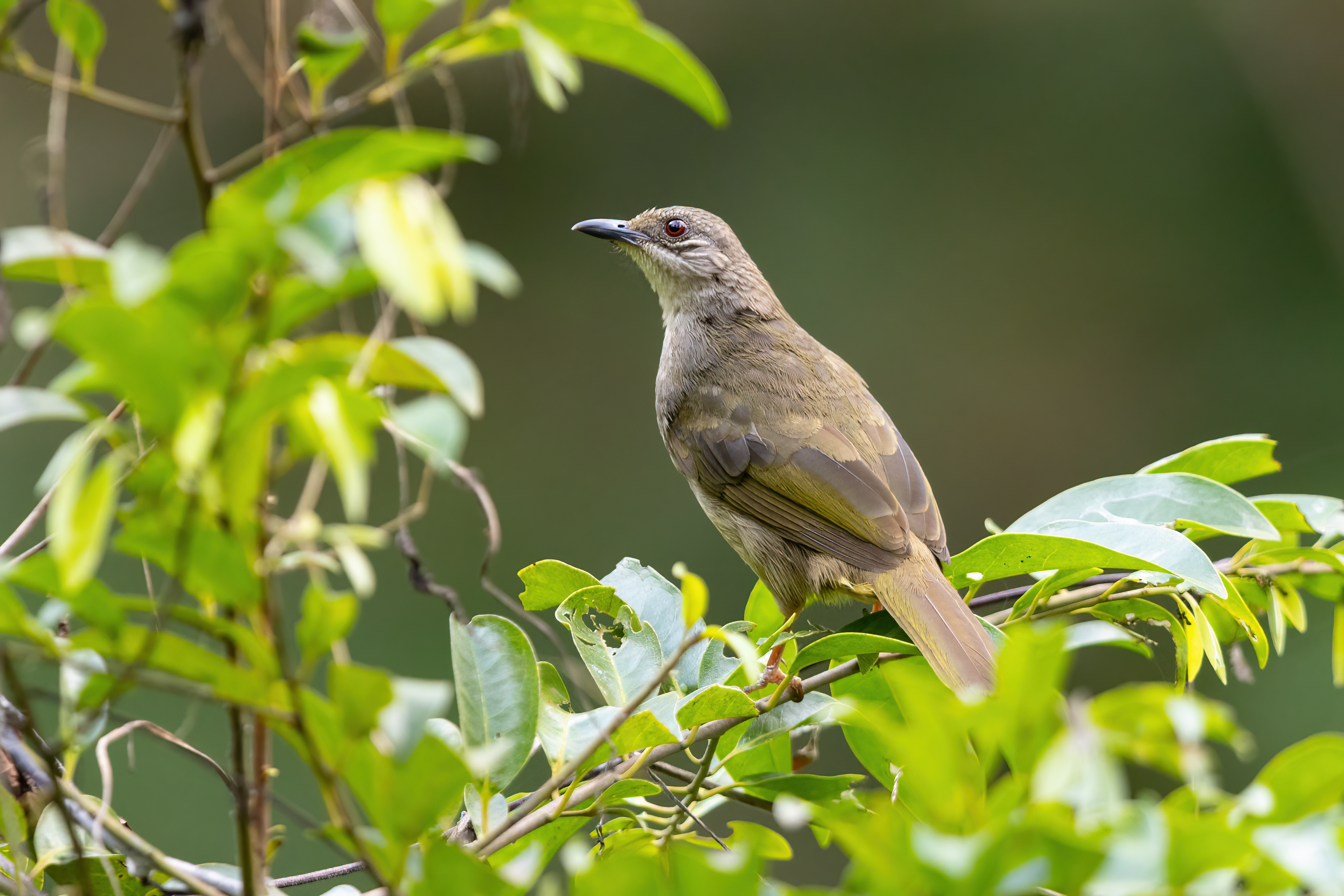

Conservation status
- Least Concern (IUCN 3.1)

Scientific classification
- Kingdom: Animalia
- Phylum: Chordata
- Class: Aves
- Order: Passeriformes
- Family: Pycnonotidae
- Genus: Pycnonotus
- Species: P. plumosus

Binomial name
- Pycnonotus plumosus Blyth, 1845
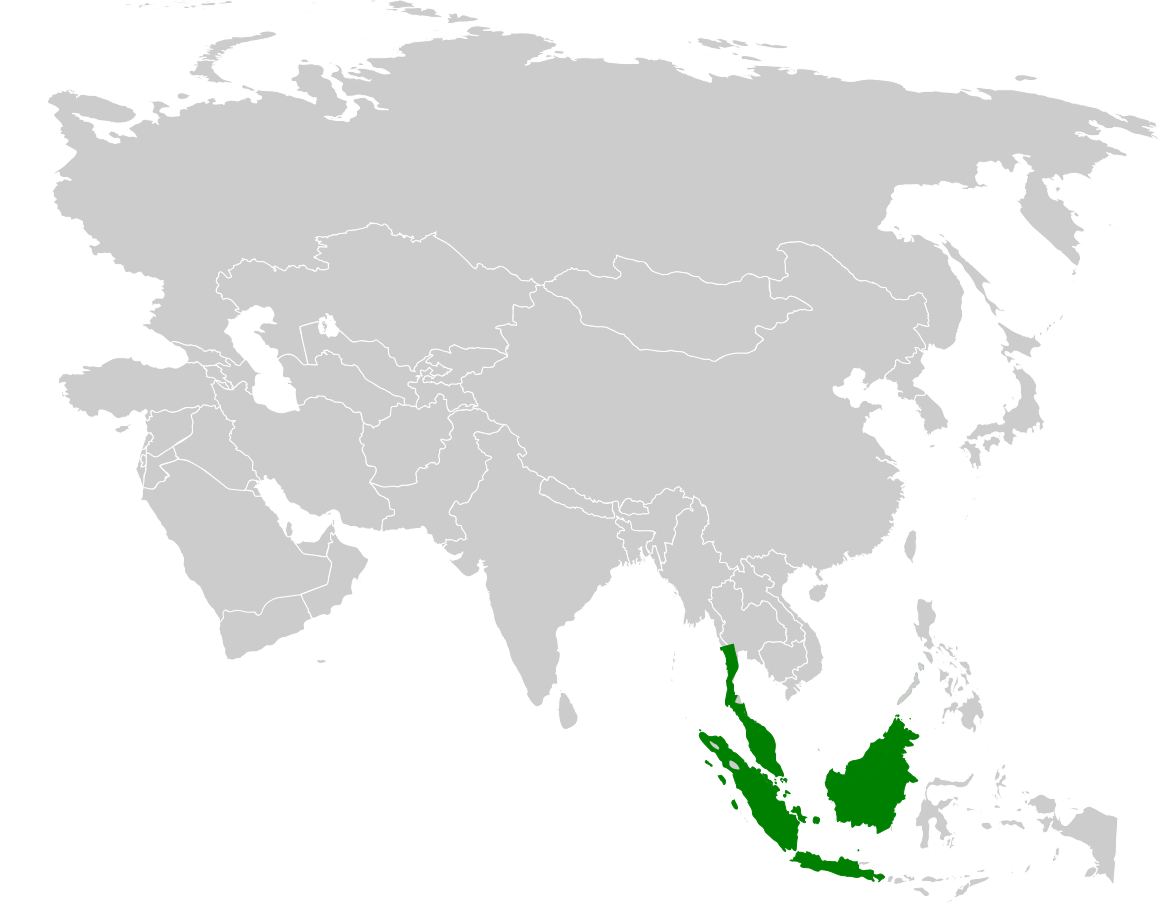

= Olive-winged bulbul =

Species of bird

The olive-winged bulbul (Pycnonotus plumosus) is a member of the bulbul family of passerine birds. It is found in south-eastern Asia and the Greater Sunda Islands. Its natural habitat is subtropical or tropical moist lowland forests.

== Diet ==
It eats fruit and insects.

== Taxonomy and systematics ==
Until 2010, the ashy-fronted bulbul was also considered as a subspecies of the olive-winged bulbul.

=== Subspecies ===
Four subspecies are recognized:

- P. p. porphyreus - Oberholser, 1912: Found on western Sumatra and nearby islands
- P. p. plumosus - Blyth, 1845: Found on Malay Peninsula, eastern Sumatra, Java, Bali and western and southern Borneo
- P. p. hutzi - Stresemann, 1938: Found on northern and eastern Borneo
- P. p. hachisukae - Deignan, 1952: Found on islands off northern Borneo and south-western Philippines
