= Brachypus =

Scientific classification
- Kingdom: Plantae
- Clade: Tracheophytes
- Clade: Angiosperms
- Clade: Eudicots
- Clade: Rosids
- Order: Brassicales
- Family: Brassicaceae
- Tribe: Alysseae
- Genus: Brachypus; Ledeb.
- Species: B. suffruticosus

Binomial name
- Brachypus suffruticosus (Vent.) V.I.Dorof.

Synonyms
- Alyssum superbum L'Hér. ex DC.; Brachypus asper Ledeb.; Farsetia suffruticosa (Vent.) DC.; Fibigia suffruticosa (Vent.) Sweet; Fibigia suffruticosa var. macrostyla Bornm.; Lunaria suffruticosa Vent. (1800) (basionym)

Genus of flowering plants

Brachypus is genus of flowering plants in the family Brassicaceae. It contains a single species, Brachypus suffruticosus, a subshrub native to eastern Turkey, Transcaucasia, Iraq, Iran, and southern Turkmenistan.
