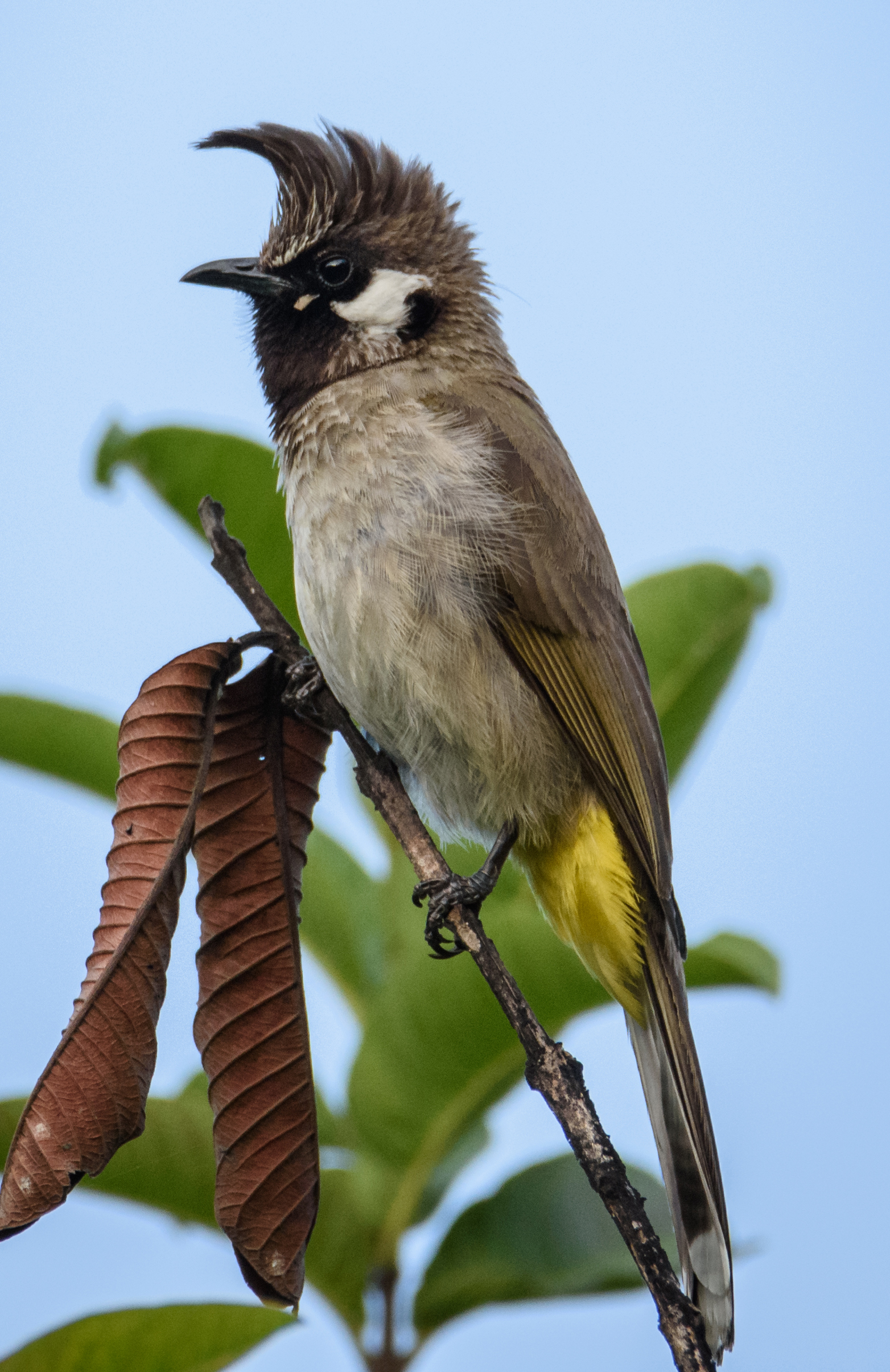

Conservation status
- Least Concern (IUCN 3.1)

Scientific classification
- Kingdom: Animalia
- Phylum: Chordata
- Class: Aves
- Order: Passeriformes
- Family: Pycnonotidae
- Genus: Pycnonotus
- Species: P. leucogenys

Binomial name
- Pycnonotus leucogenys (Gray, JE, 1835)
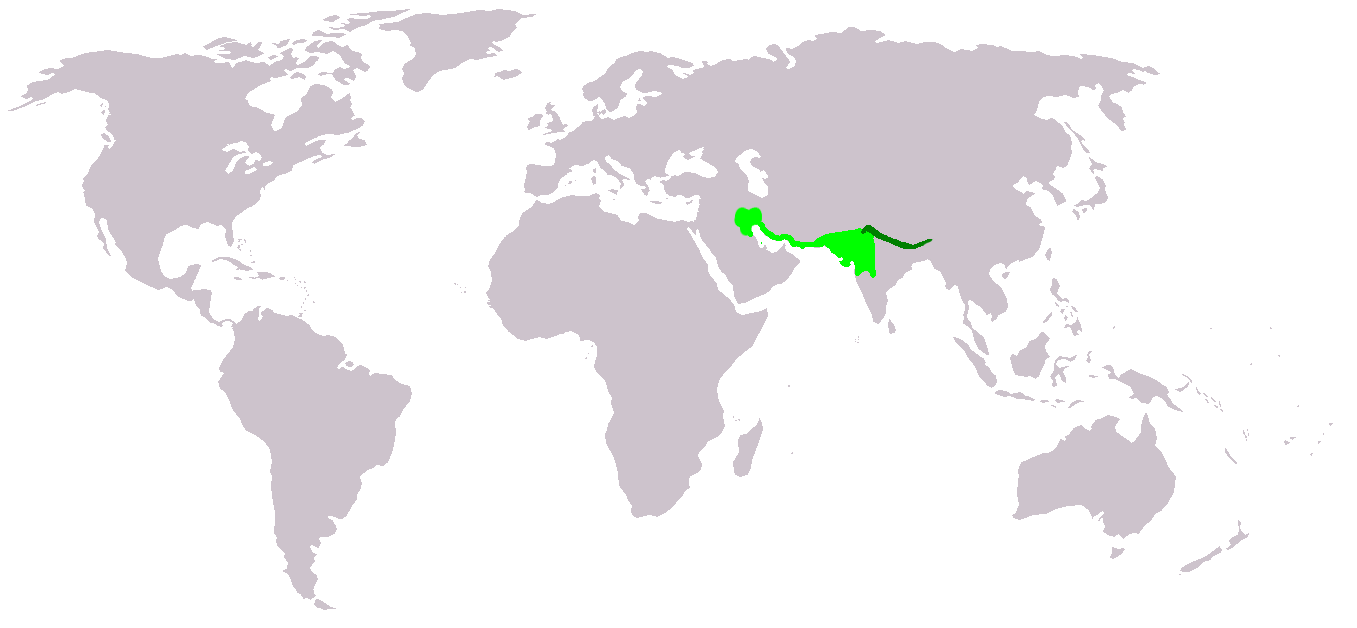
- Distribution of P. leucotis (light green) and P. leucogenys (dark green) in the South Asian region

Synonyms
- Brachypus leucogenys; Pycnonotus leucogenis

= Himalayan bulbul =

Species of songbird

The Himalayan bulbul (Pycnonotus leucogenys), or white-cheeked bulbul, is a species of songbird in the bulbul family found in Central and South Asia.

== Taxonomy and systematics ==
The Himalayan bulbul is considered to belong to a superspecies along with the white-eared bulbul, white-spectacled bulbul, African red-eyed bulbul, Cape bulbul, and common bulbul. The alternate name, white-cheeked bulbul, is also used by the white-eared bulbul.

== Description ==
The Himalayan bulbul is about 18 cm in length, with a wingspan of 25.5–28 cm and an average weight of 30 g. Its head, throat, and crest are black and white. The back, side, and lengthy tail are brown, the underside is pale yellow. Sexes have similar plumage. The song is a beautiful 4-part whistle, which resembles an accelerated oriole whistle.

== Distribution and habitat ==
The species occurs in the northern regions of the Indian subcontinent and some adjoining areas. It is found predominantly in Kashmir and near the Himalayas.

The Himalayan bulbul frequents forests and shrubland and also comes into gardens and parks.

== Behaviour and ecology ==
The Himalayan bulbul feeds on insects and other small invertebrates, as well as berries, fruits, seeds, buds and nectar.

Nests are usually built in bushes or low branches, are cup-shaped, and made of stems, roots and twigs. The female usually lays three eggs, which are incubated for 12 days. The chicks leave the nest when they are 9–11 days old. There may be up to three broods raised per year. During breeding, adults become very territorial.

== Gallery ==
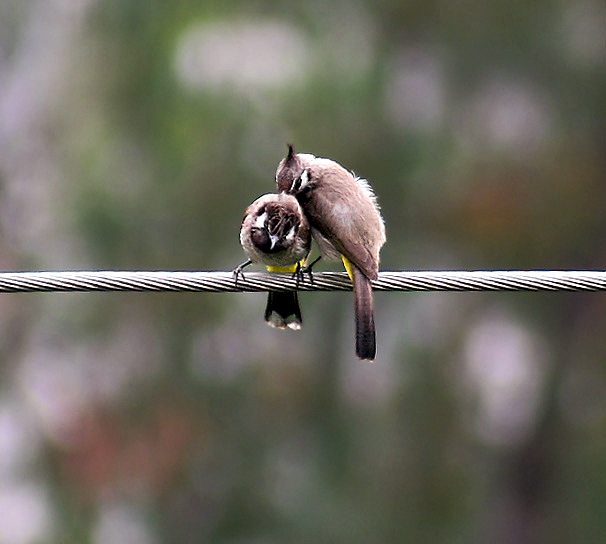

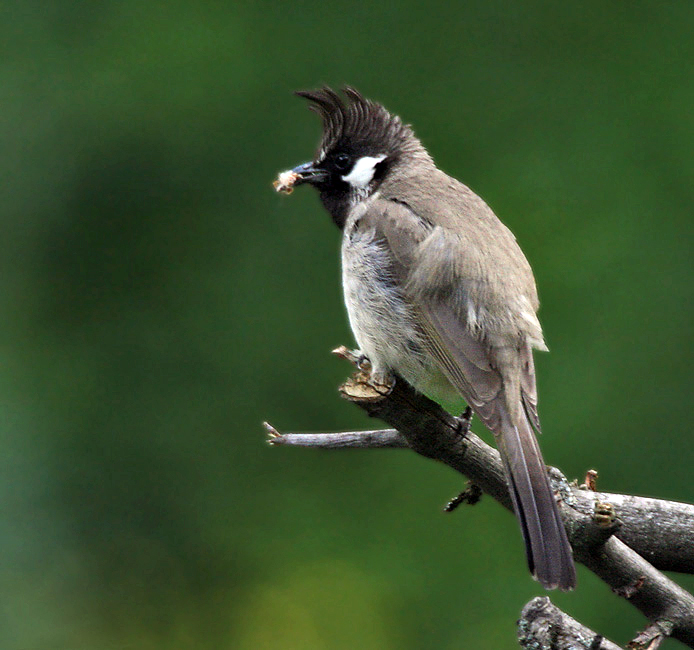

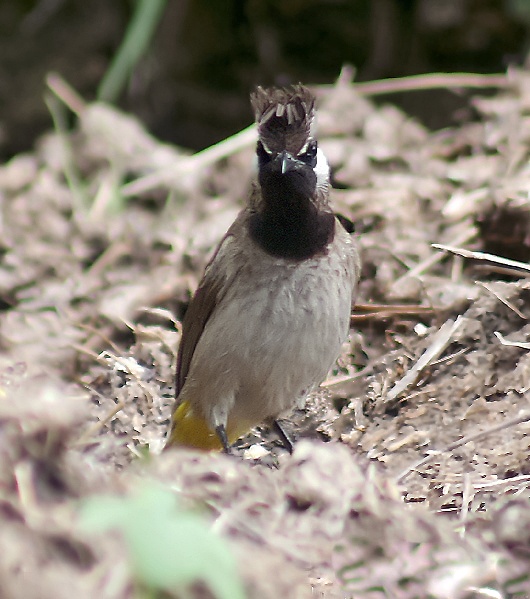

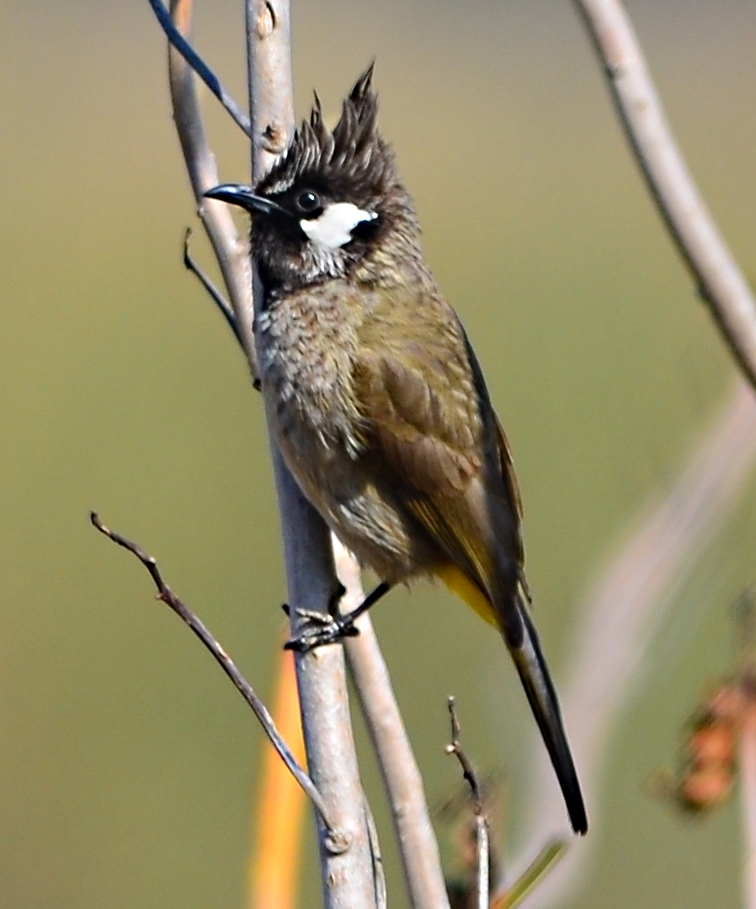
In the Punjab, India

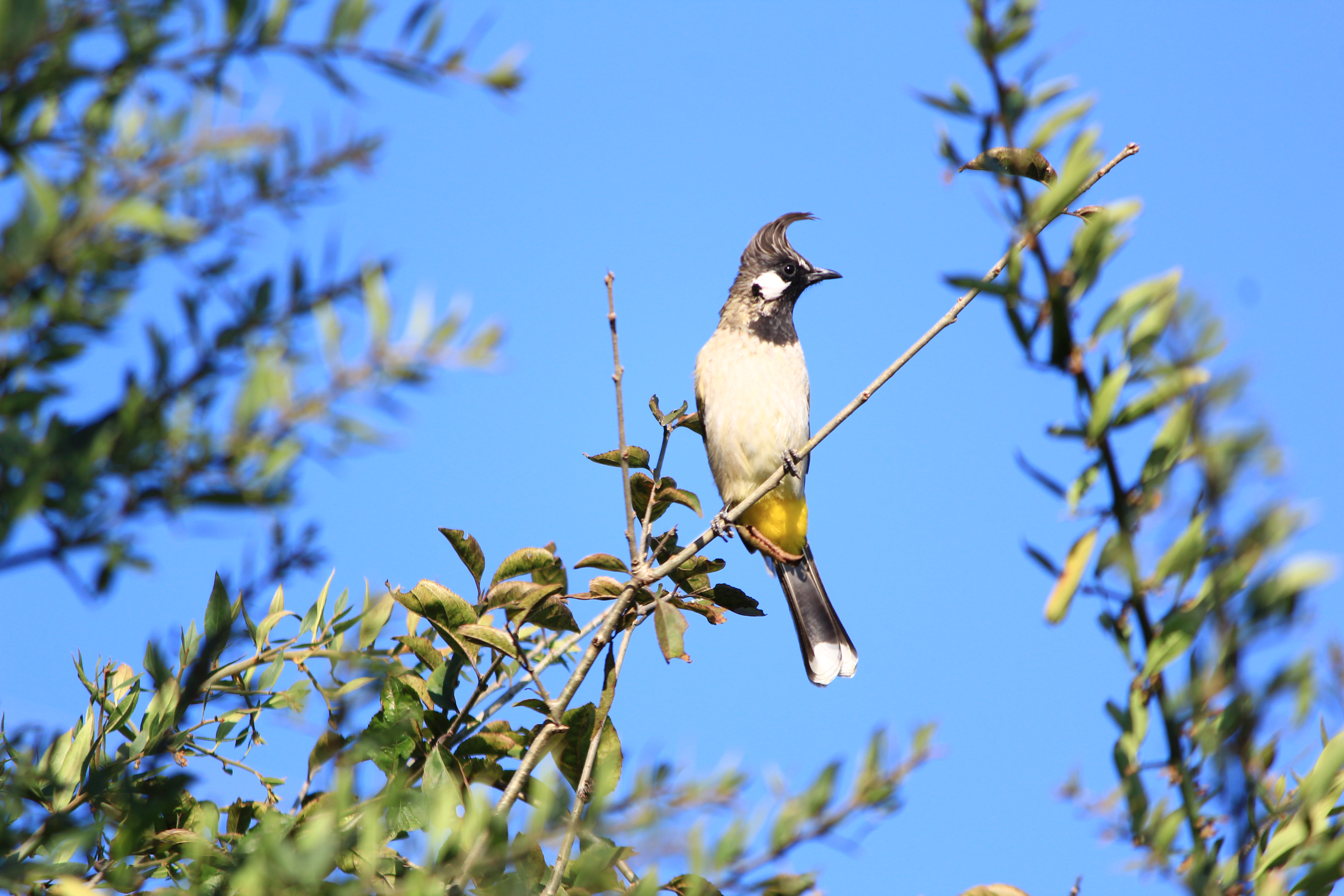
At the Shimla Water catchment, Himachal Pradesh

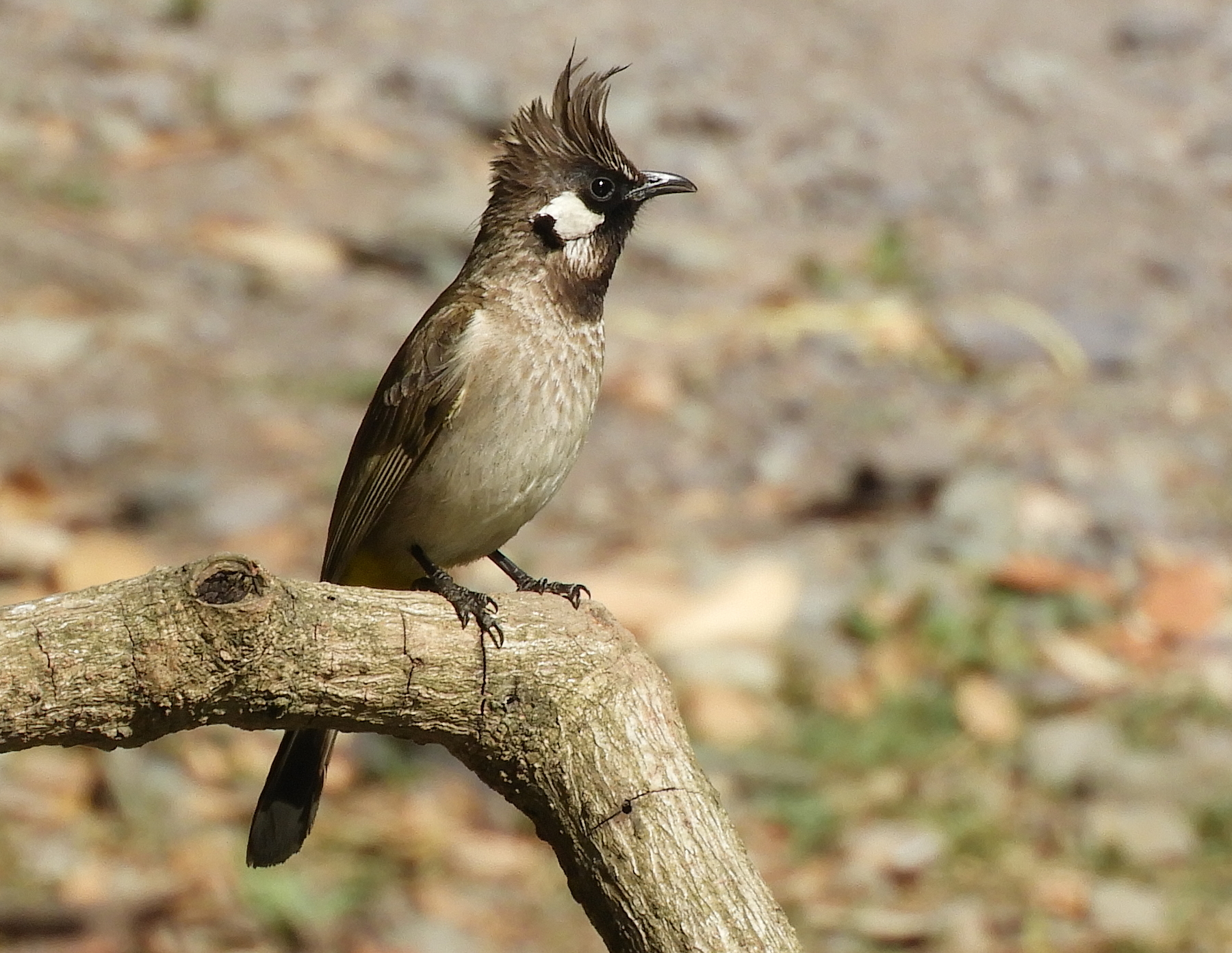
Himalayan bulbul at Sattal

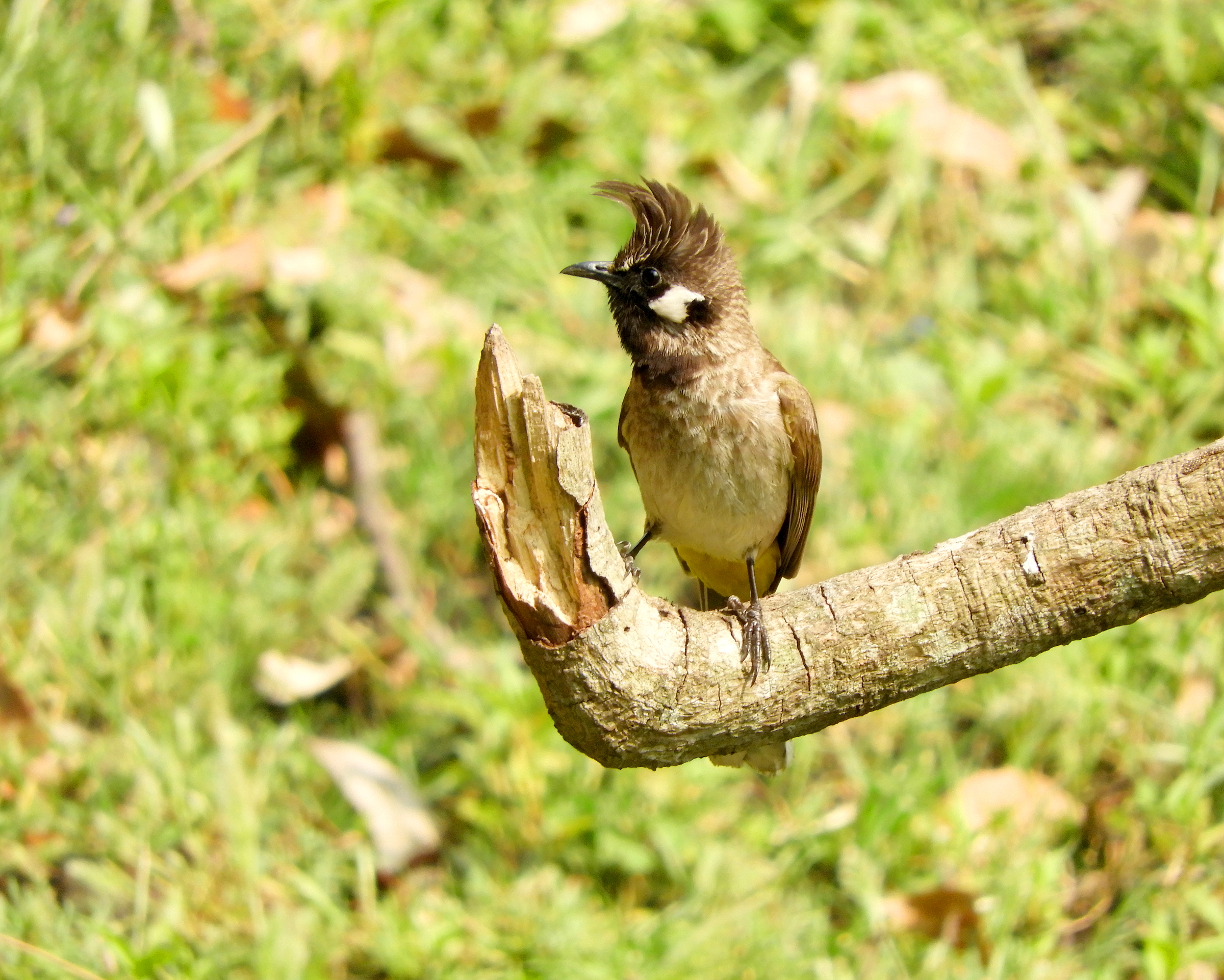
Himalayan bulbul at Sattal Kumaon India

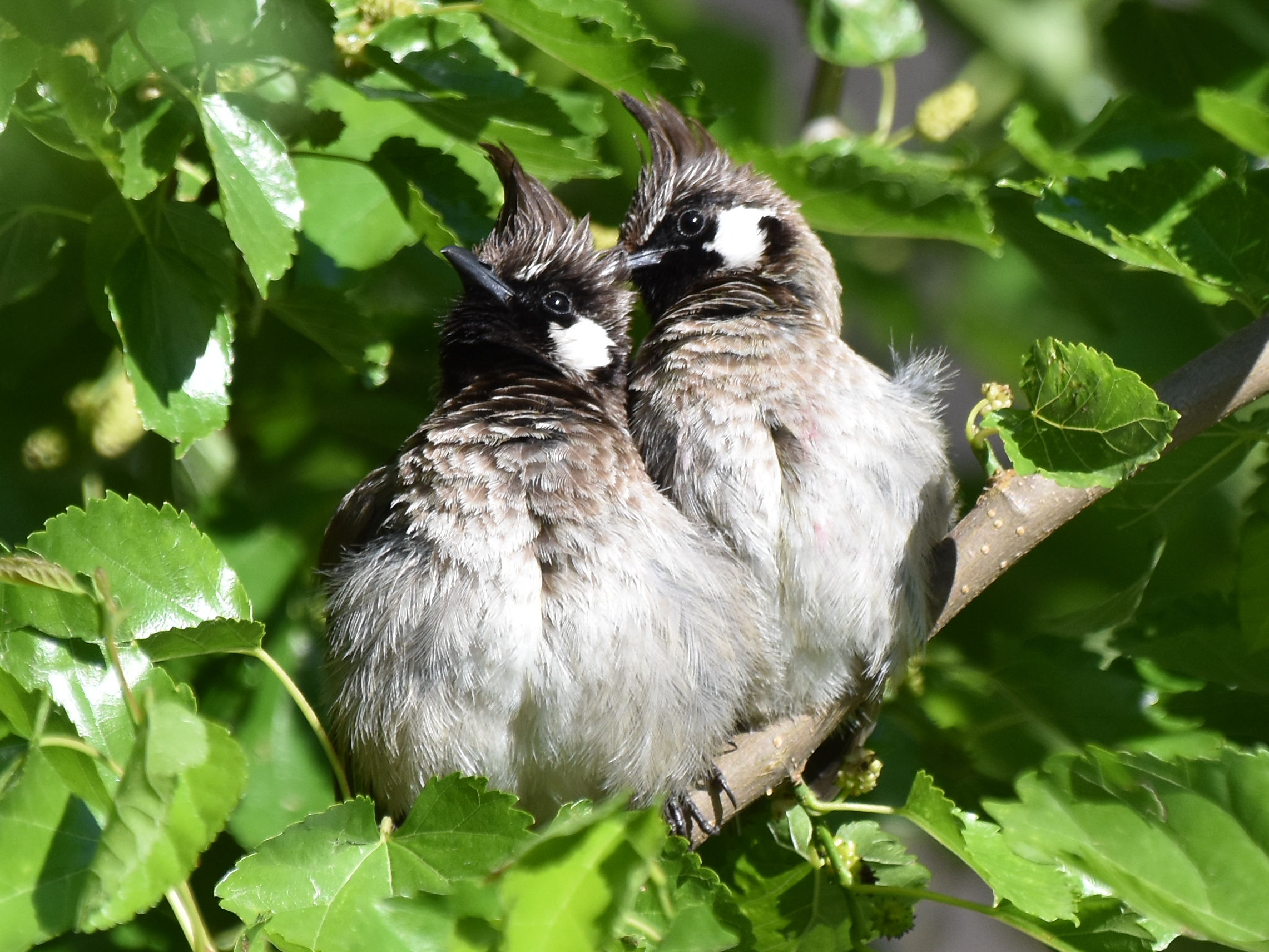
Himalayan bulbuls courting, IIT Mandi, Himachal Pradesh, India, 22 April 2020

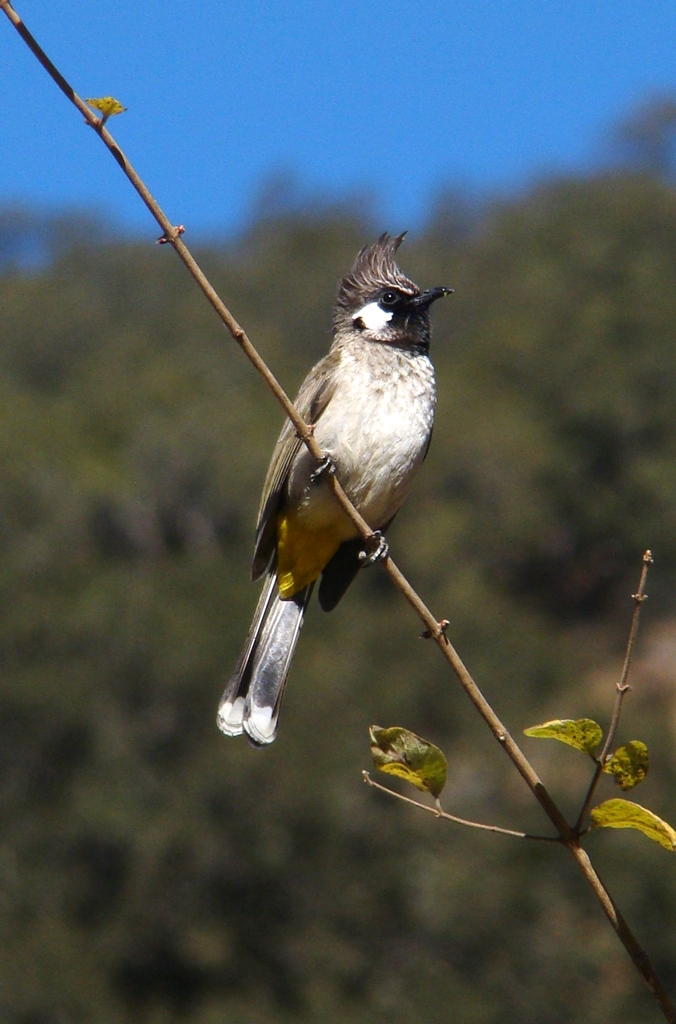
