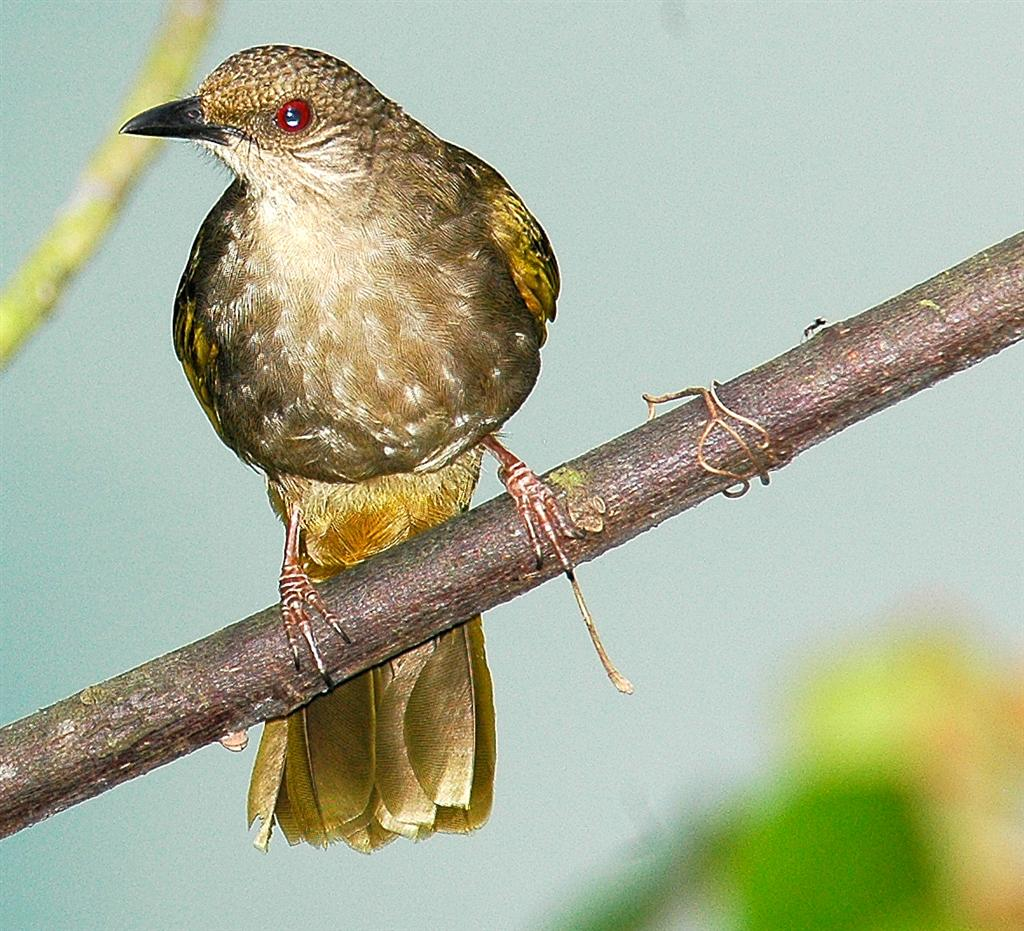
- Olive-winged bulbul (Pycnonotus plumosus)

Scientific classification
- Kingdom: Animalia
- Phylum: Chordata
- Class: Aves
- Order: Passeriformes
- Family: Pycnonotidae
- Genus: Pycnonotus; F. Boie, 1826

Type species
- Turdus capensis (Cape bulbul) Linnaeus, 1766

Synonyms
- Brachypus; Haematornis; Kelaartia; Micropus; Molpastes; Oreoctistes; Otocompsa; Xanthiscus

= Pycnonotus =

Genus of birds

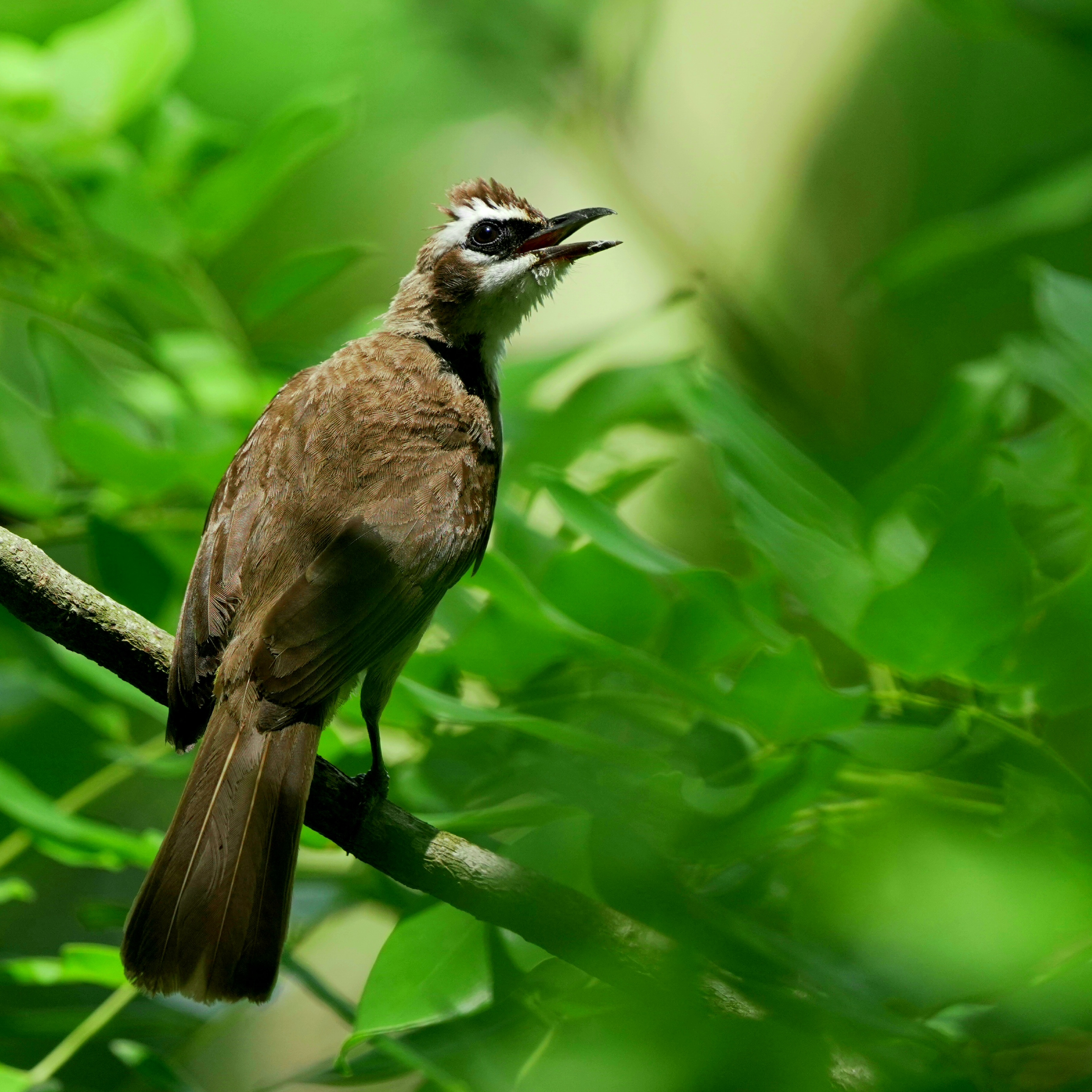
Yellow-vented bulbul (Pycnonotus goiavier)

Pycnonotus is a genus of frugivorous passerine birds in the bulbul family Pycnonotidae.

== Taxonomy and systematics ==
The genus Pycnonotus was introduced by the German zoologist Friedrich Boie in 1826 with the Cape bulbul as the type species. The name of the genus combines the Ancient Greek words puknos "thick" or "compact" and -nōtos "-backed".

The genus contains the following 32 species:

Image	Scientific name	Common name	Distribution
	Cream-vented bulbul	Pycnonotus simplex	Malaysia
	Olive-winged bulbul	Pycnonotus plumosus	Malaysia
	Barusan bulbul	Pycnonotus porphyreus	Indonesia
	Asian red-eyed bulbul	Pycnonotus brunneus	Malaysia
	Straw-headed bulbul	Pycnonotus zeylanicus	Malaysia
	Spot-necked bulbul	Pycnonotus tympanistrigus	Bukit Barisan
	Cream-eyed bulbul	Pycnonotus pseudosimplex	northern Borneo
	Ashy-fronted bulbul	Pycnonotus cinereifrons	Palawan
	White-browed bulbul	Pycnonotus luteolus	South Asia
	Ayeyarwady bulbul	Pycnonotus blanfordi	Myanmar
	Streak-eared bulbul	Pycnonotus conradi	Indochina
	Stripe-throated bulbul	Pycnonotus finlaysoni	Indochina
	Pale-eyed bulbul	Pycnonotus davisoni	Myanmar
	Flavescent bulbul	Pycnonotus flavescens	Northeast India and northern Indochina
	Aceh bulbul	Pycnonotus snouckaerti	northern Sumatra
	Orange-spotted bulbul	Pycnonotus bimaculatus	montane Sumatra, Java and Bali
	Pale-faced bulbul	Pycnonotus leucops	montane Borneo
	Yellow-throated bulbul	Pycnonotus xantholaemus	southern India
	Yellow-eared bulbul	Pycnonotus penicillatus	Sri Lanka
	Brown-breasted bulbul	Pycnonotus xanthorrhous	China and northern Indochina
	Light-vented bulbul	Pycnonotus sinensis	China, Japan (Ryukyu Islands) and Taiwan
	Styan's bulbul	Pycnonotus taivanus	Taiwan
	Red-whiskered bulbul	Pycnonotus jocosus	South India, southern China and Indochina
	Yellow-vented bulbul	Pycnonotus goiavier	Southeast Asia
	Red-vented bulbul	Pycnonotus cafer	South Asia and Myanmar
	Sooty-headed bulbul	Pycnonotus aurigaster	southern China and Indochina
	White-eared bulbul	Pycnonotus leucotis	Irak, Persian Gulf to northwestern India
	Himalayan bulbul	Pycnonotus leucogenys	Himalayas
	White-spectacled bulbul	Pycnonotus xanthopygos	Middle East
	African red-eyed bulbul	Pycnonotus nigricans	southern Africa
	Common bulbul	Pycnonotus barbatus	Africa
	Cape bulbul	Pycnonotus capensis	fynbos of South Africa

=== Former species ===
In previous circumscriptions the genus Pycnonotus was considerably larger. Recent taxonomic revisions have seen many species transferred to other genera.

In 2010, eighteen former Pycnonotus species were reclassified into different genera, either directly from Pycnonotus or from the genus Andropadus, to which they had already been transferred by some authorities. These changes were as follows:

- one species was transferred to genus Stelgidillas.
  - Slender-billed greenbul ( former Pycnonotus gracilirostri or Pycnonotus gracilirostris)
- twelve species were transferred to genus Arizelocichla:
  - Shelley's greenbul (former Pycnonotus masukuensis)
  - Kakamega greenbul (nominate) (former Pycnonotus kakamegae)
  - Cameroon greenbul (former Pycnonotus montanus, as Arizelocichla montana)
  - Western greenbul (former Pycnonotus tephrolaemus)
  - Olive-breasted greenbul (former Pycnonotus tephrolaema)
  - Mountain greenbul (former Pycnonotus nigriceps)
  - Uluguru greenbul (former Pycnonotus neumanni)
  - Black-browed greenbul (former Pycnonotus fusciceps)
  - Yellow-throated greenbul (former Pycnonotus chlorigula)
  - Stripe-cheeked greenbul (former Pycnonotus milanjensis)
  - Olive-headed greenbul (former Pycnonotus olivaceiceps)
  - Stripe-faced greenbul (former Pycnonotus strifacies)
- five species were transferred to genus Eurillas:
  - Little greenbul (former Pycnonotus virens)
  - Little grey greenbul (former Pycnonotus gracilis)
  - Ansorge's greenbul (former Pycnonotus ansorgei)
  - Plain greenbul (former Pycnonotus curvirostris)
  - Yellow-whiskered greenbul (former Pycnonotus latirostris)

In 2020, a further 17 species were transferred to other genera:

- Black-and-white bulbul (former Pycnonotus melanoleucos, moved to the monotypic genus Microtarsus)
- Puff-backed bulbul (former Pycnonotus eutilotus, moved to the monotypic genus Eutilotus)
- Yellow-wattled bulbul (former Pycnonotus urostictus, moved to monotypic genus Poliolophus)
- Two species to genus Alcurus:
  - Striated bulbul (former Pycnonotus striatus)
  - Spot-necked bulbul (former Pycnonotus tympanistrigus)
- Four species to genus Brachypodius:
  - Grey-headed bulbul (former Pycnonotus priocephalus)
  - Black-headed bulbul (former Pycnonotus atriceps, as Brachypodius melanocephalos; the species epithet melanocephalos has priority over atriceps)
  - Andaman bulbul (former Pycnonotus fuscoflavescens)
  - Blue-wattled bulbul (former Pycnonotus nieuwenhuisii)
- Three species to genus Ixodia:
  - Spectacled bulbul (former Pycnonotus erythropthalmos)
  - Grey-bellied bulbul (former Pycnonotus cyaniventris)
  - Scaly-breasted bulbul (former Pycnonotus squamatus)
- Five species to genus Rubigula:
  - Black-crested bulbul (former Pycnonotus flaviventris)
  - Flame-throated bulbul (former Pycnonotus gularis)
  - Black-capped bulbul (former Pycnonotus melanicterus)
  - Ruby-throated bulbul (former Pycnonotus dispar)
  - Bornean bulbul (former Pycnonotus montis)

Other former Pycnonotus species include:

- Sombre greenbul (former Pycnonotus importunus, now Andropadus importunus)
- Yellow-throated leaflove (former Haematornis flavicollis or Pycnonotus flavicollis, now Atimastillas flavicollis)
- Hairy-backed bulbul (former Brachypodius criniger, now Tricholestes criniger)
- Bare-faced bulbul (former Pycnonotus hualon, now Nok hualon)
- Cream-striped bulbul (former Pycnonotus leucogrammicus, now Hemixos leucogrammicus)
