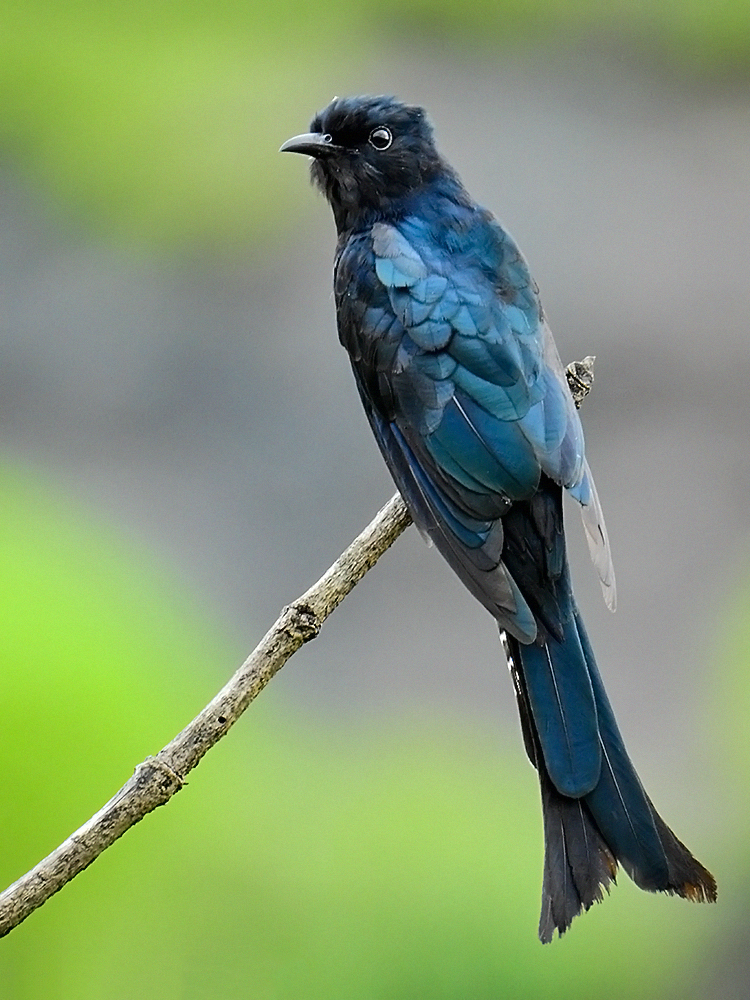
- Mangaon, Raigad, Maharashtra

Conservation status
- Least Concern (IUCN 3.1)

Scientific classification
- Kingdom: Animalia
- Phylum: Chordata
- Class: Aves
- Order: Cuculiformes
- Family: Cuculidae
- Genus: Surniculus
- Species: S. dicruroides

Binomial name
- Surniculus dicruroides (Hodgson, 1839)

= Fork-tailed drongo-cuckoo =

Species of bird

The fork-tailed drongo-cuckoo (Surniculus dicruroides) is a species of cuckoo that resembles the Black drongo (Dicrurus macrocercus). It is found mainly in hill forests in peninsular India and Sri Lanka although some specimens are known from the Himalayan foothills. It can be identified by its metallic black plumage, straight beak, white barred vent, forked tail and white spot on the back of the head. The fork-tailed drongo-cuckoo's song has been described as a series of 5 or 6 whistling "pip-pip-pip-pip-pip-" notes rising in pitch with each "pip". They are also known for their drongo-like calls such as "quip" calls in flight and "wheep-wheep" call with a higher second note. In Sri Lanka, the fork-tailed drongo-cuckoo also has similar calls to the Sri Lanka Drongo (Dicrurus lophorinus).

Call (recorded in southern India)

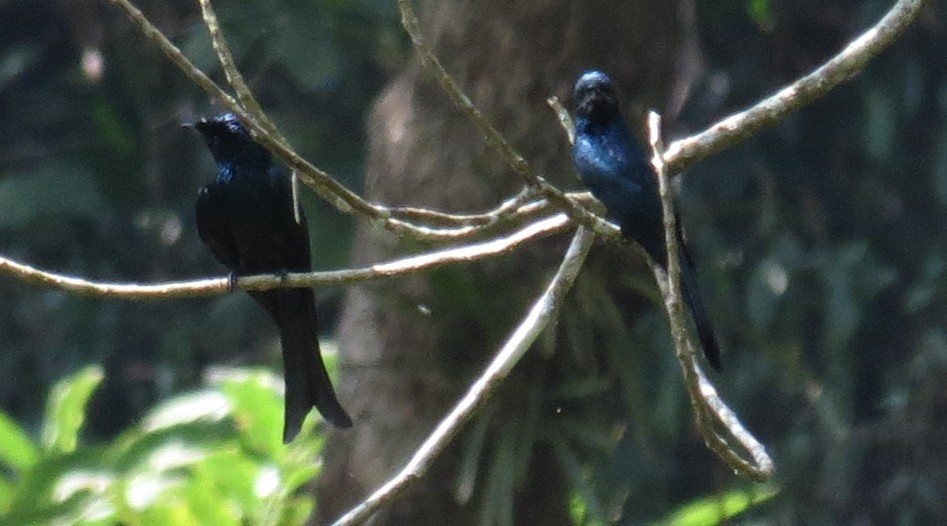
Fork-tailed drongo-cuckoo

It is a brood parasite on small babblers. It is not known how or whether the drongo-like appearance benefits this species but it is suspected that it aids in brood-parasitism just as hawk-cuckoos appear like hawks.

== Description ==
Drongo cuckoos are recognisable by their glossy blue to purple or greenish black plumage, their forked tail with slight narrow white bars, their white patch at the base of the feathers and their thin horizontal white stripe in the underwing that is only seen when in flight. The species does not show any sexual dimorphism. The bill is black with an orange mouth lining, the tarsi and toes are black, blueish grey and at times pinkish. Juveniles are distinguishable from adult birds by white spots found across their body (head, wing and breast) and presence of a few brown feather.

The bird exhibits specific moulting steps (Complex Basic strategy) before reaching its final plumage. Juveniles need to go through a performative moult and then a formative moult before reaching their definitive moults. Some birds undergo partial moults and have as such a combination of both adult and juvenile plumage. It is not yet clear the reasons nor the causes for this.

The species' length can go from 24.5cm to 26cm. As all perching birds the structure of the foot is zygodactyle, three toes in front and one behind. This feature distinguishes it from the ceylon drongo-cuckoo also known as square-tailed drongo-cuckoo (Surniculus lugubris) which appears quite similar to the fork-tailed drongo-cuckoo. These two species are often confused for one another which limits the thorough understanding of each species. The foot structure is not the only distinctive feature. The fork-tailed drongo-cuckoo, as the name indicates, has a more forked tail while the square-tailed drongo-cuckoo is much more squarish. The calls of these two species have different frequencies, however this cannot be assessed by ear.

Fork-tailed drongo-cuckoo and black drongo share similarities in size, plumage and forked tail. Like the hawk-cuckoo which mimics hawks, the fork-tailed drongo-cuckoo imitates the black drongo among other birds that it is a brood parasite too. However, the fork-tailed drongo-cuckoo has a down-curved bill (typical of cuckoos) and can be differentiated by its flight. The cuckoo has a smooth and direct flight while the Black Drongo has more acrobatics or swooping.

== Taxonomy and systematics ==
Alternative name: Indian Drongo-cuckoo

=== Historical classification ===
The species was first described by Brian Hodgson in Nepal as Pseudornis dicruroides in 1839. It was later placed as a subspecies of Surniculus lugubris. It was then put, in 1862, along with Cuculus lugubris, as separate species, in the genus Cuculus. Due to significant variation in appearances and range distribution, a decision to re-arrange the taxa was taken in 1913. They were rearranged as subspecies under Surniculus lugubris as follow:

- S. l. lugubris (Java, Bali, and Sri Lanka)
- S. l. brachyurus (Malay Peninsula, Sumatra, and Borneo)
- S. l. dicruroides (Northern India, Myanmar, and Thailand)
- S.l. velutinus (endemic to the Philippines; now defined as a distinctive species, Philippine Drongo-Cuckoo (Surniculus velutinus)).

However, in 1919, Baker disagreed and proposed his own taxonomy based on both wing and tail lengths. He advocated for there to be two species Surniculus musschenbrocki and Surniculus lugubris with each several subspecies:

- Surniculus lugubris
  - S. l. lugubris (Java, Bali, Sumatra and Borneo)
  - S. l. minimus (Palawan)
  - S. l. dicruroides (Northern India, Burma, Thailand, Upper Assam, China)
  - S. l. stewarti (Sri Lanka)
- Surniculus musschenbrocki
  - S. m. musschenbrocki (Indonesia)
  - S. m. velutinus (Philippines)

=== Modern classification ===
In 2005, it was suggested that the species should be split from the more narrowly defined square-tailed drongo-cuckoo Surniculus lugubris due to morphological (especially tail shape) and call differences. It has been found that across the Indian subcontinent, the Square-tailed Drongo Cuckoo has a lower frequency song than the Fork-tailed Drongo Cuckoo.

There are now two subspecies:

- Surniculus dicruroides dicruroides (Hodgson, 1839)- Fork-tailed Drongo Cuckoo, Indian Subcontinent
- Surniculus dicruroides stewarti (Baker, 1919) - Ceylon Drongo Cuckoo, Sri Lanka, smaller overall, less forked and curved tail

== Distribution and habitat ==
=== Distribution ===
The fork-tailed drongo-cuckoos are mostly found in peninsular India and Sri Lanka. While in Sri Lanka the fork-tailed drongo-cuckoos remain mainly resident with some possible local migrations, in India the bird is both a resident and migrant. Some individuals stay yearly in limited parts of Kerala and Goa, others migrate for the winter to southern areas of India (Kerala and Kernataka) and move North to central India, Maharashtra, Rajasthan and Eastern Ghats in summer times. The fork-tailed drongo-cuckoo was spotted as well in Nepal, East Pakistan and even eastward across southern China, southward Tenasserim, Thailand and up to Sumatra as a migrant.

=== Habitat ===
It is found in a variety of habitats, including woodland, scrub jungle, plantations, orchard, hill forests and sometimes in plains. The altitude at which it can be observed depends on the location and has a broad range, from lower Himalayas (~200m) up to 2,600m. It is an arboreal bird that keep to the canopy foliage of trees and shrubs but will go to more exposed bare branches when calling (especially during breeding season). The calls are what helps identify the presence and species of the bird and due to the almost total absence of vocalising during the non-breeding season, they are harder to observe.

== Behaviour and ecology ==
=== Breeding ===
The species is a brood-parasite and as such it lay its eggs in other species nests; these eggs are very similar and mimic those of the host to ensure care. It was reported that fork-tailed drongo-cuckoo are brood-parasite on drongos (Dicrurus), forktails (Enicurus), minivets (Pericrocotus) and Black-headed Babbler (Rhopocichla atriceps).

The breeding season starts in March to October (during monsoon season) in North India, in April-June in Sikkim, December-May in Sri Lanka, from January to March in Kerala and in June in Nepal. Songs are used by the bird to attract a mate, their crescendo call is especially used when the bird is excited or when a mate is in the surroundings. Songs are only heard during the breeding season; during the rest of the year the bird remains almost completely quiet.

=== Food and feeding ===
Fork-tailed Drongo cuckoo are insectivores. Their diet is mainly composed of insects, especially caterpillars and soft-bodied insects caught in flight or snapped from trees, though sometimes includes fruits such as banyan and figs.

=== Threats or survival ===
The fork-tailed drongo-cuckoo's ability to mimic other birds, specifically those that they are parasitic too, contributes to their survivability. In order to maintain their population and their success rate, hatching juveniles instinctively push out of the nest the hosts' eggs and any hatched nestling. The similarities of the eggs, plumage, body size and shape allows them to pass through the cracks and not be recognised as an importer in the hosts' nests and ensure that the host parents continue to feed and take care of the nestlings and juveniles.

== Relationship to humans and Status ==
Fork-tailed drongo-cuckoos are included in Schedule IV of the Indian Wildlife Protection Act of 1972 along with many forest and woodland birds.

According to the IUCN Red List this specie is categorised as Least Concern. However, they are being traded locally as pets and hunted for food. There are for now no large conservation measure except for the protection of identified sites over their entire range. While there are no specific studies as to human activities' impact on this species, general trends like climate change or habitat destruction have been found to negatively affect the Avifauna of the Himalaya region.
