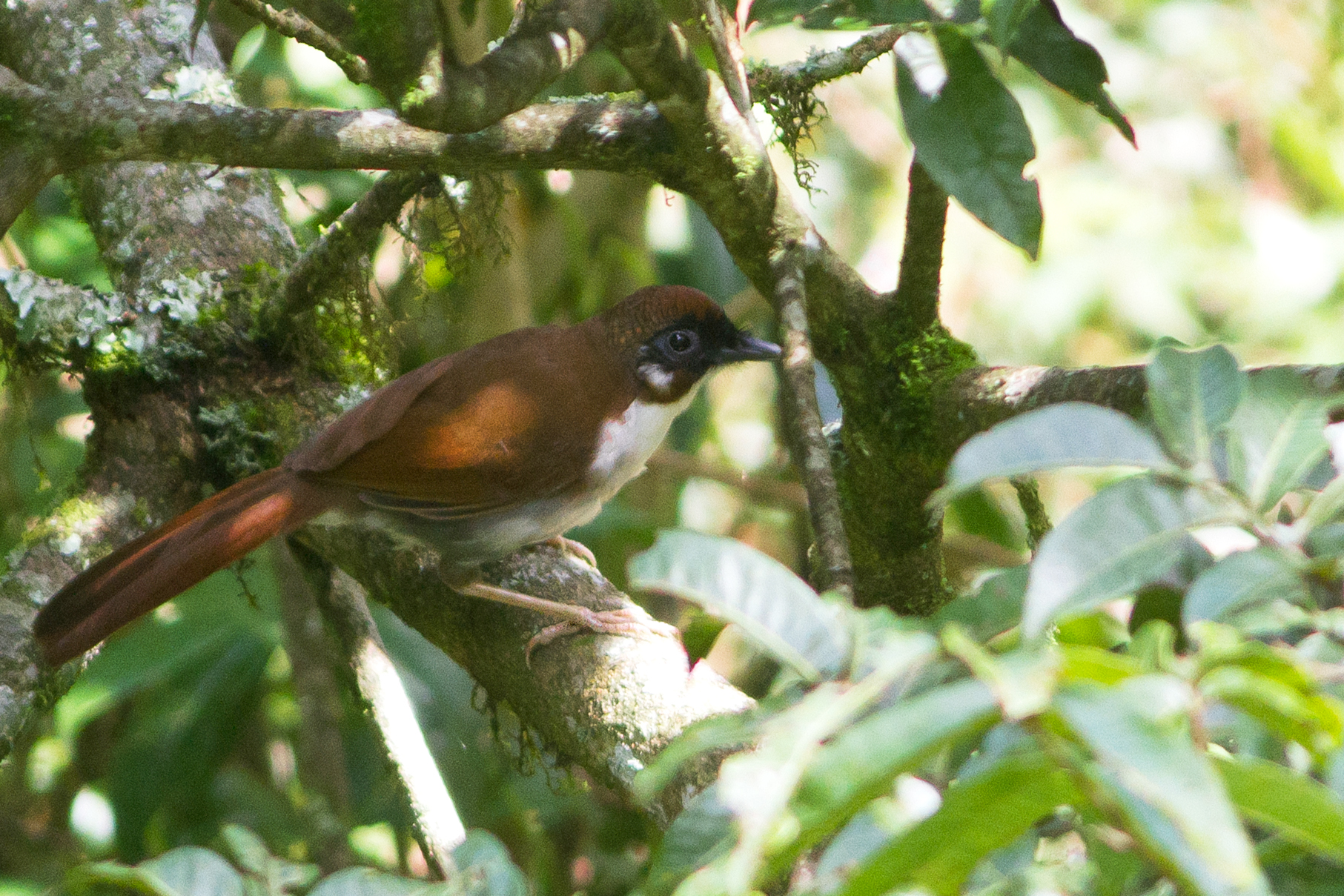
- From Sumin Reserve Forest, Sikkim, India

Conservation status
- Least Concern (IUCN 3.1)

Scientific classification
- Kingdom: Animalia
- Phylum: Chordata
- Class: Aves
- Order: Passeriformes
- Family: Leiothrichidae
- Genus: Pterorhinus
- Species: P. caerulatus

Binomial name
- Pterorhinus caerulatus (Hodgson, 1836)

Synonyms
- Ianthocincla caerulata Garrulax caerulatus

= Grey-sided laughingthrush =

Species of bird

The grey-sided laughingthrush (Pterorhinus caerulatus) is a species of passerine bird in the family Leiothrichidae.

This species was formerly placed in the genus Garrulax but following the publication of a comprehensive molecular phylogenetic study in 2018, it was moved to the resurrected genus Pterorhinus.

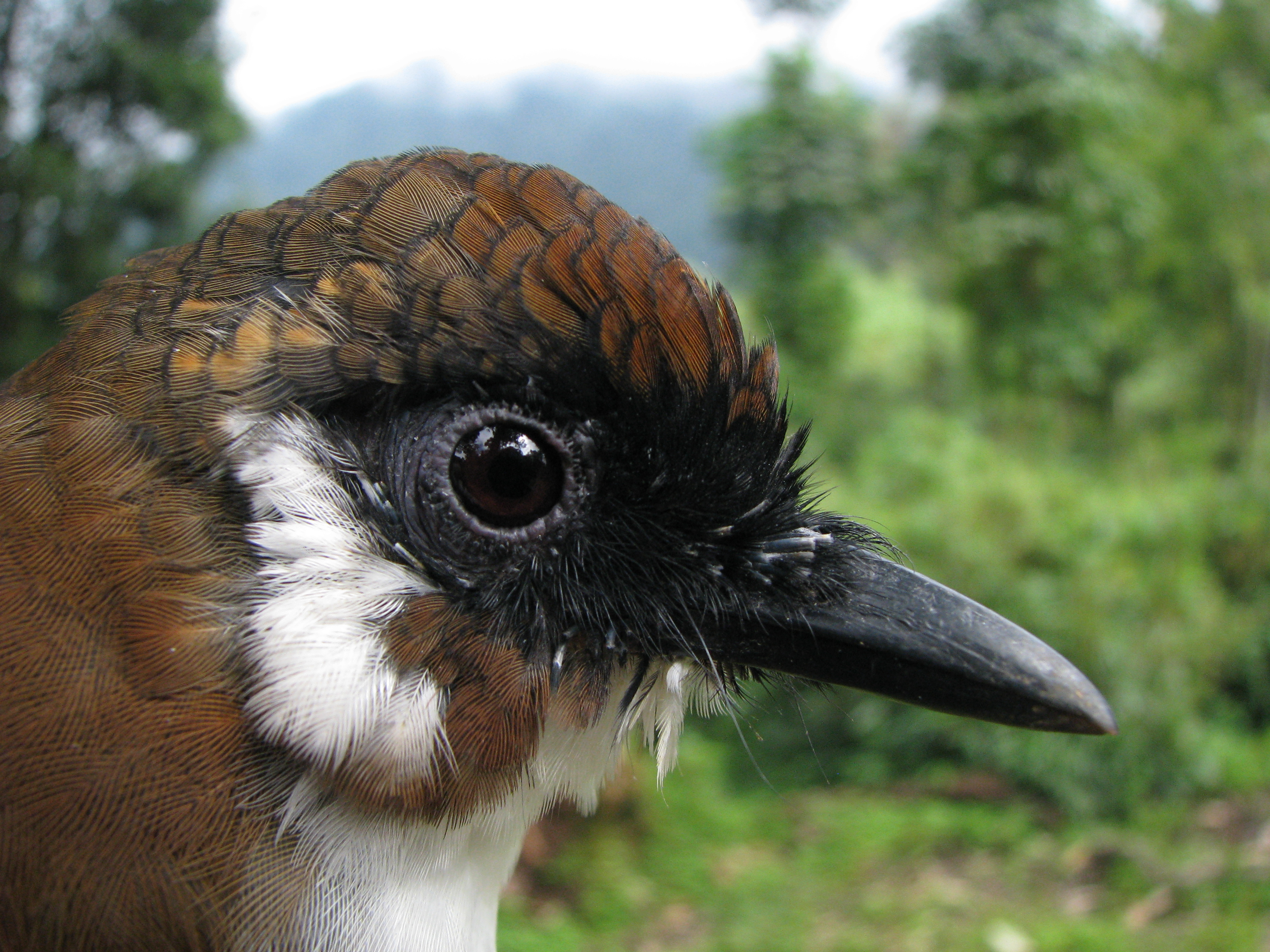
Close-up of head, Arunachal Pradesh, India.

It is found in Bhutan, China, India, Myanmar, Nepal, and the Hawaiian Islands (where it was introduced). Its natural habitat is subtropical or tropical moist montane forests.
