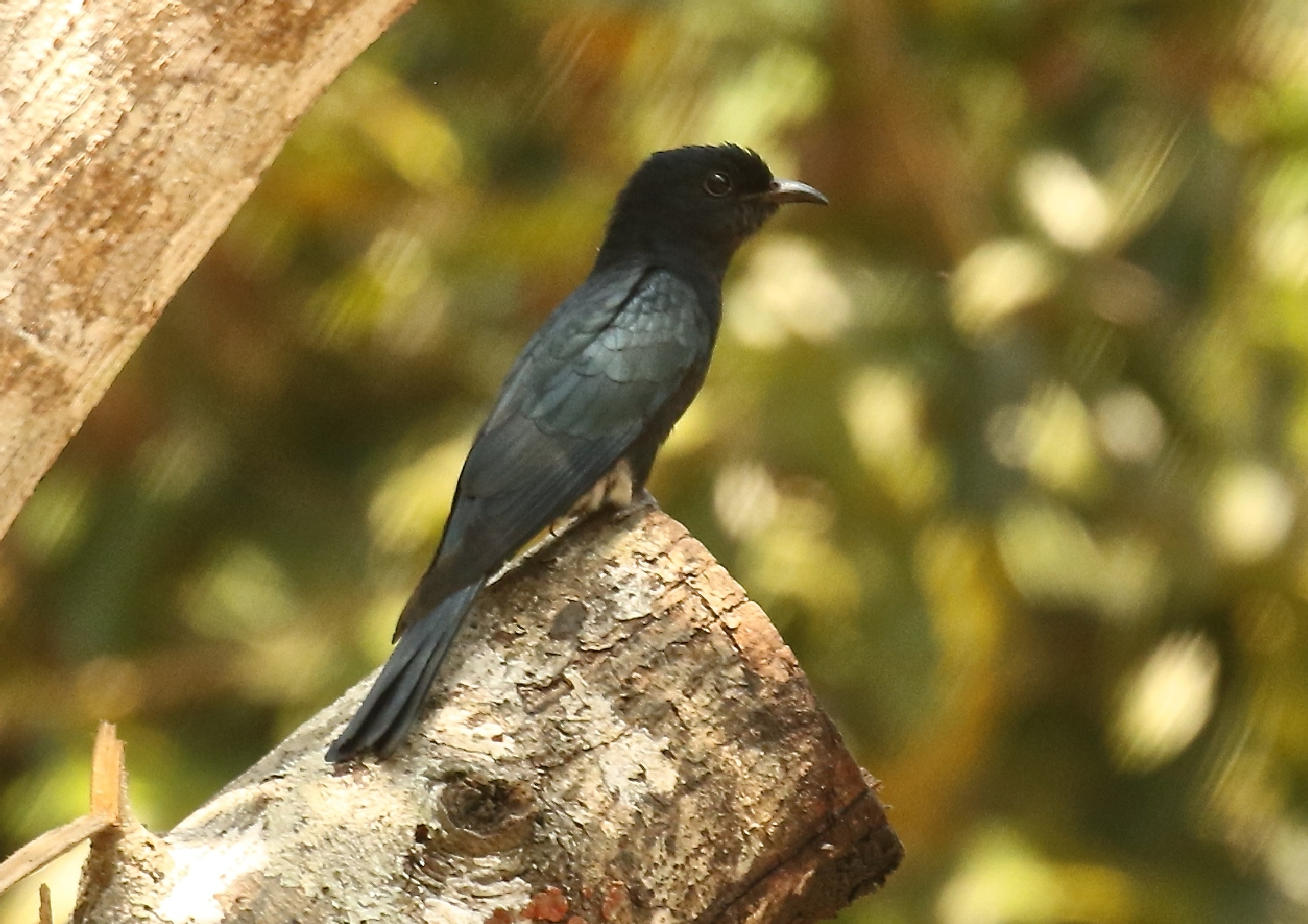
- Khao Yai National Park - Thailand

Conservation status
- Least Concern (IUCN 3.1)

Scientific classification
- Kingdom: Animalia
- Phylum: Chordata
- Class: Aves
- Order: Cuculiformes
- Family: Cuculidae
- Genus: Surniculus
- Species: S. lugubris

Binomial name
- Surniculus lugubris (Horsfield, 1821)

= Square-tailed drongo-cuckoo =

Species of bird

The square-tailed drongo-cuckoo (Surniculus lugubris) is a species of cuckoo that resembles a black drongo. It is found along the Himalayas extending east into Southeast Asia. The calls are series of piercing sharp whistles rising in pitch but shrill and choppily delivered. In the past, the species S. lugubris also included the subspecies dicruroides, which is now treated as a separate species, the fork-tailed drongo-cuckoo.

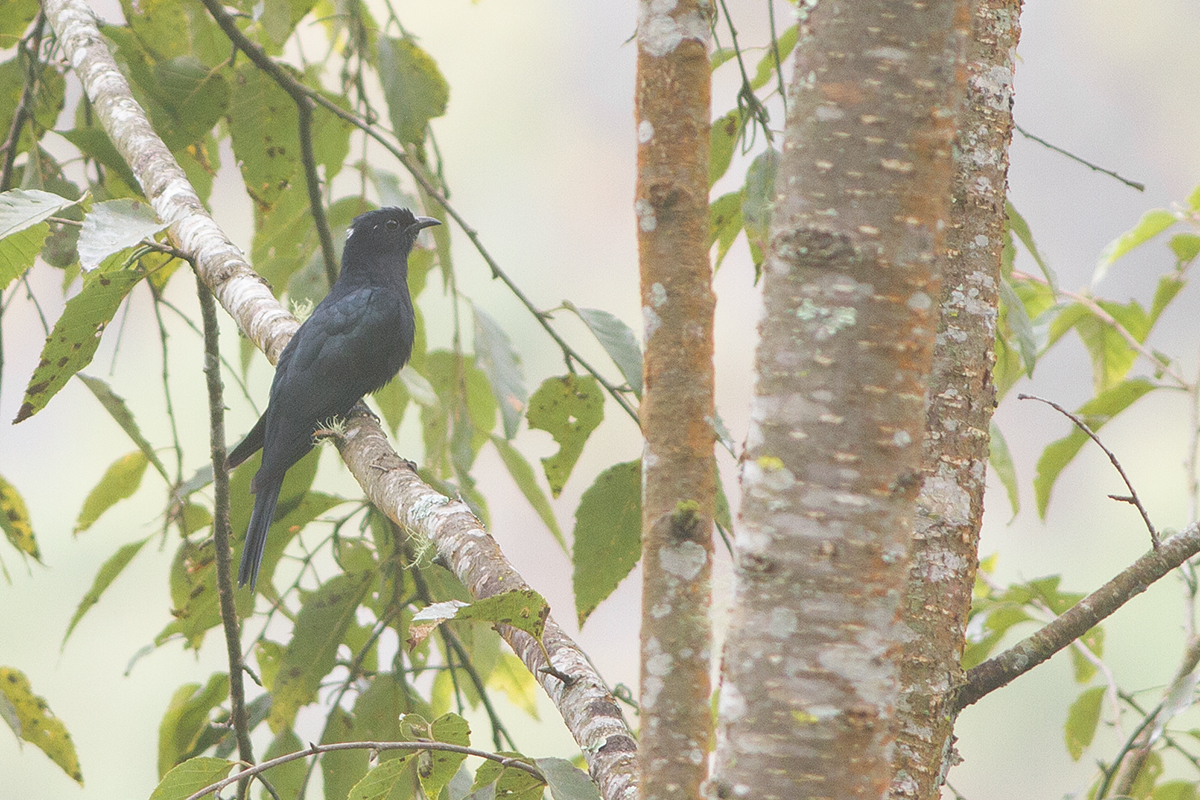
From East Pendam-Budang birding area, Sumin Reserve Forest in Sikkim, India

== Description ==
The square-tailed drongo-cuckoo can be easily distinguished by its downcurved beak and the white barred vent and outer undertail, and the tail only notched with slightly flared tips. In flight, a white wing-stripe is visible from below. It is a brood parasite on small babblers. It is not known how or whether the drongo-like appearance benefits this species but it is suspected that it aids in brood-parasitism just as hawk-cuckoos appear like hawks.

The square-tailed drongo-cuckoo was formerly considered conspecific with the fork-tailed drongo-cuckoo (together known as the Asian drongo-cuckoo), but vocal and morphological differences suggested that the species should be split.
