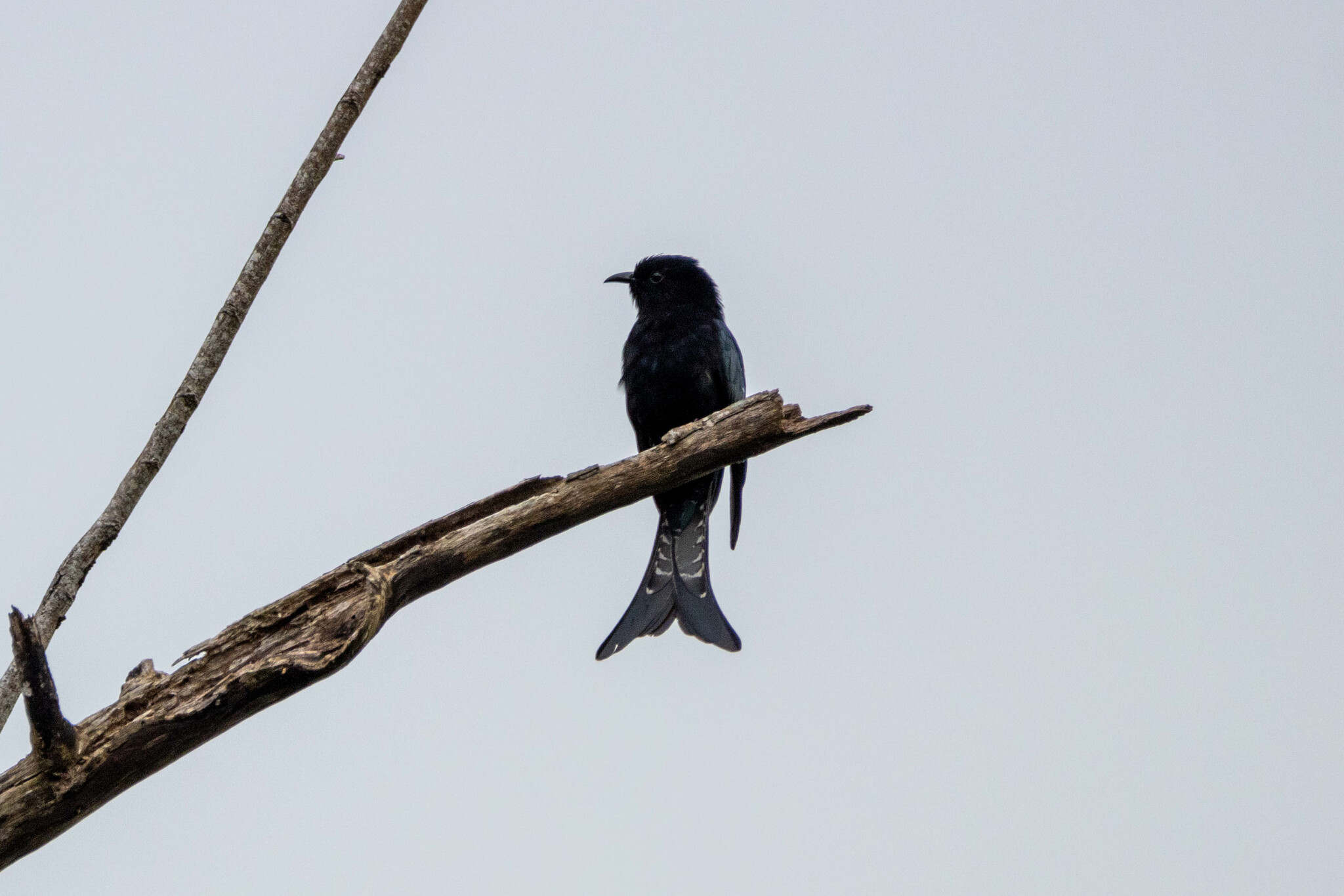

Conservation status
- Least Concern (IUCN 3.1)

Scientific classification
- Kingdom: Animalia
- Phylum: Chordata
- Class: Aves
- Order: Cuculiformes
- Family: Cuculidae
- Genus: Surniculus
- Species: S. musschenbroeki

Binomial name
- Surniculus musschenbroeki Meyer, AB, 1878

= Moluccan drongo-cuckoo =

Species of bird

The Moluccan drongo-cuckoo (Surniculus musschenbroeki) is a species of cuckoo. It is found on Sulawesi, Buton, Obira, Bacan and Halmahera islands in Indonesia.
