= Indian Birds =

- Discipline: Ornithology
- Language: English
- Edited by: Praveen Jayadevan (Praveen J)

Publication details
- Former name: Newsletter for Ornithologists
- History: 2004–present
- Publisher: New Ornis Foundation
- Frequency: Bimonthly

Standard abbreviations
- ISO 4: Indian Birds

Indexing
- ISSN: 0973-1407

Links
- Journal homepage

Indian Birds is a bi-monthly ornithology journal/newsletter that was established in 2004. It was formerly published under the heading Newsletter for Ornithologists for one year. It publishes articles on identification, distribution, migration, conservation and taxonomy, apart from reports of significant ornithological sightings and events. Published from Hyderabad, the publication is owned by New Ornis Foundation.

== Overview ==
In 2006, the Bugun liocichla, a new bird species from Arunachal Pradesh was described by Ramana Athreya in this journal. The description of the bird carried in the journal was made without the collection of a type specimen as they were too few to risk killing one. Though this practice was not unprecedented, with four prior instances, the pure charisma of the bird together with this practice created a controversy in the scientific and conservation community on the costs and benefits of this approach

The journal has published 683 articles in its first eight volumes. Nearly 125 of these articles are referenced in the text of Handbook of the Birds of the World online. In 2016, Indian Birds published the official bird checklist for the country

Aasheesh Pittie was the editor of this journal since its inception until recently and he now is the editor emeritus. Praveen J is the present Chief Editor with Puja Sharma, Pritam Baruah, and Muzaffar A Kichloo as associate editors.

The first south Asian records of the following species were published in this journal.

- Cory's shearwater, Calonectris borealis
- Sabine's gull, Xema sabini
- Blue-winged pitta, Pitta moluccensis
- Black-browed bushtit, Aegithalos bonvaloti
- Crested tit-warbler, Leptopoecile elegans
- Yunnan nuthatch, Sitta yunnanensis
- Chinese thrush Zoothera mupinensis
- Mugimaki flycatcher, Ficedula mugimaki
- Tristram's bunting, Emberiza tristrami

The first national records of the following species were published in this journal.

- Short-tailed shearwater, Ardenna tenuirostris (India and Bangladesh)
- Long-tailed jaeger, Stercorarius longicaudus
- Woodchat shrike, Lanius senator
- Asian stubtail, Urosphena squameiceps

Apart from publishing pure novelties, the journal has published opinion pieces.

Some of the special issues published include

- Andaman and Nicobar Islands
- MigrantWatch
- Bhutan
- Arunachal Pradesh
- Gujarat
- Pelagic birds

== See also ==
- List of ornithology journals
