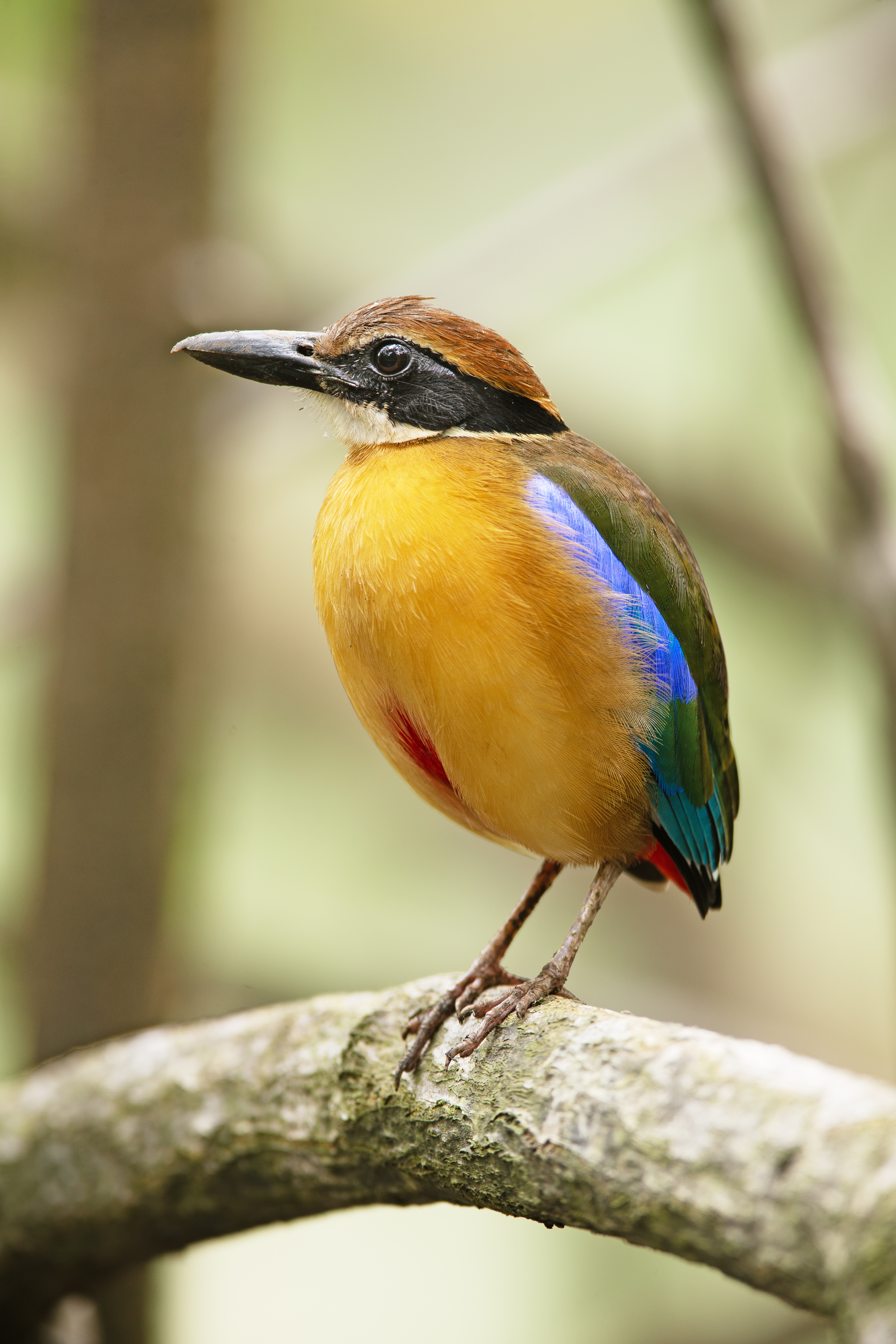
- in Singapore

Conservation status
- Near Threatened (IUCN 3.1)

Scientific classification
- Kingdom: Animalia
- Phylum: Chordata
- Class: Aves
- Order: Passeriformes
- Family: Pittidae
- Genus: Pitta
- Species: P. megarhyncha

Binomial name
- Pitta megarhyncha Schlegel, 1863

= Mangrove pitta =

Species of bird

The mangrove pitta (Pitta megarhyncha) is a species of passerine bird in the family Pittidae native to the eastern Indian subcontinent and western Southeast Asia. It is part of a superspecies where it is placed with the Indian pitta, the fairy pitta and the blue-winged pitta but has no recognized subspecies. A colourful bird, it has a black head with brown crown, white throat, greenish upper parts, buff underparts and reddish vent area. Its range extends from India to Malaysia and Indonesia. It is found in mangrove and nipa palm forests where it feeds on crustaceans, mollusks and insects. Its call, sometimes rendered as wieuw-wieuw, is sung from a high perch on a mangrove tree.

== Taxonomy ==
The mangrove pitta was first described by German ornithologist Hermann Schlegel in 1863. Its species name is derived from the Ancient Greek words mega- "large", and rhynchos "beak". It forms a superspecies with the Indian pitta (P. brachyura), fairy pitta (P. nympha) and blue-winged pitta (P. moluccensis). Alternate common names include: Larger blue-winged/Malay pitta, Brève des palétuviers (in French), Große Blauflügelpitta (in German), and Pita de Manglar (in Spanish). There are no recognized subspecies.

== Description ==
Kuala Selangor, Malaysia, Aug 1994

Measuring 180 to 210 mm (7.1–8.3 in) in length, the mangrove pitta has a black head with a buff-coloured crown, white chin and buff underparts. The shoulders and mantle are greenish and the vent is reddish. Juveniles have similar patterned plumage but are duller. It resembles the blue-winged pitta but can be distinguished by its much heavier bill. Its call, transcribed as wieuw-wieuw has been noted to be "more slurred" than the blue-winged pitta.

== Distribution and habitat ==
The mangrove pitta is native to the countries of: Bangladesh, India, Indonesia, Malaysia, Myanmar, Singapore, and Thailand (primarily the west coast of the southern Thai peninsula). Its natural habitat is specialised and restriction to subtropical or tropical mangrove forests and Nipa palm stands. It is threatened by habitat loss from the destruction of its mangrove habitats for agricultural and urban uses. Its diet consists of crustaceans, mollusks and terrestrial insects.

== Behaviour ==
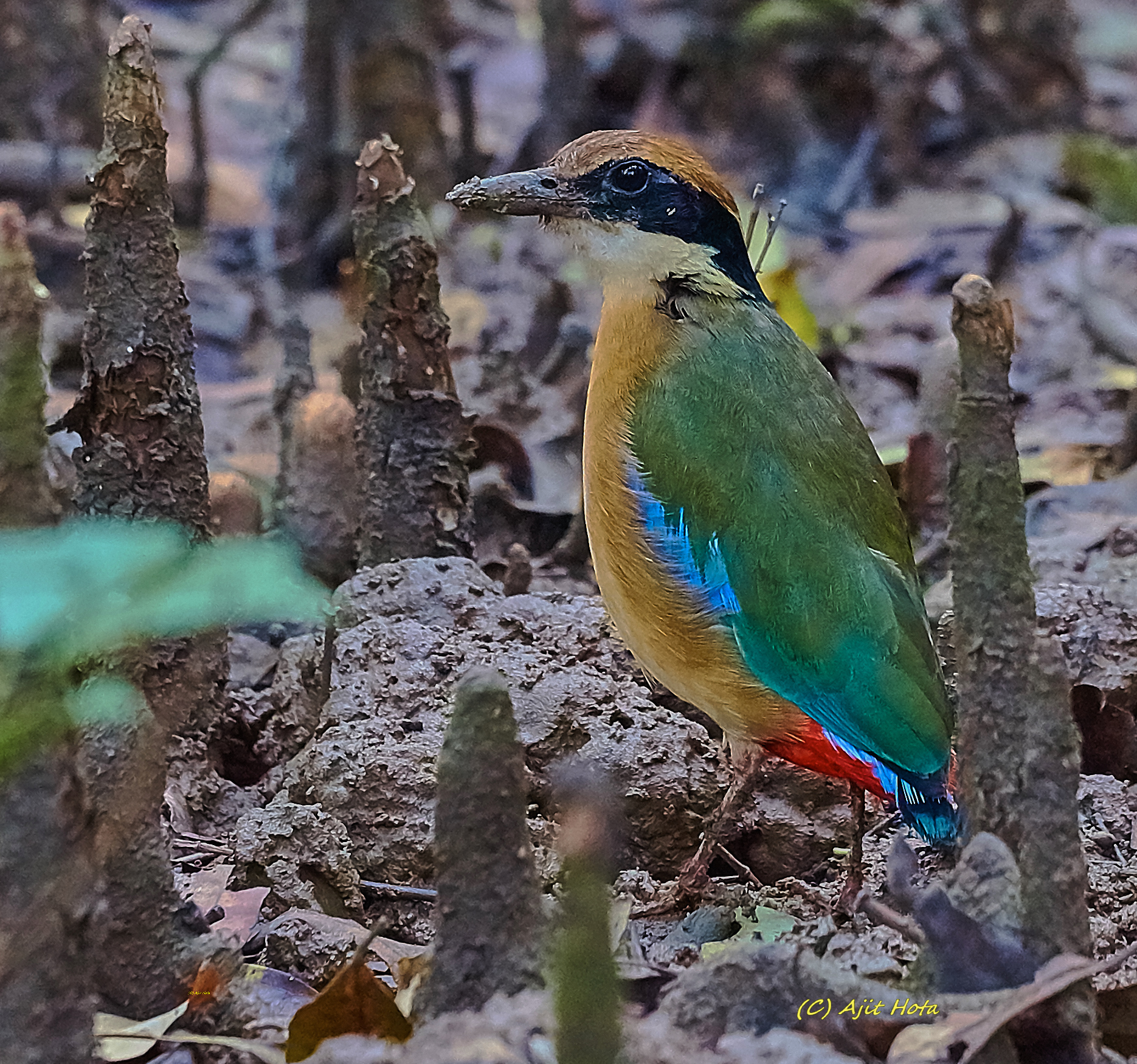
Mangrove pitta at Bhitarkanika National Park, Odisha, India

While all pittas are noted for being difficult to study and spot in the wild, the mangrove pitta is one of the easier ones to spot as it sits high up in mangrove trees and calls. A tape recording of its call will often bring it forth. It tends to be vocal while brooding but quiet at other times. A recent paper from Sunderbans Tiger Reserve reported swimming behavior of the species.
