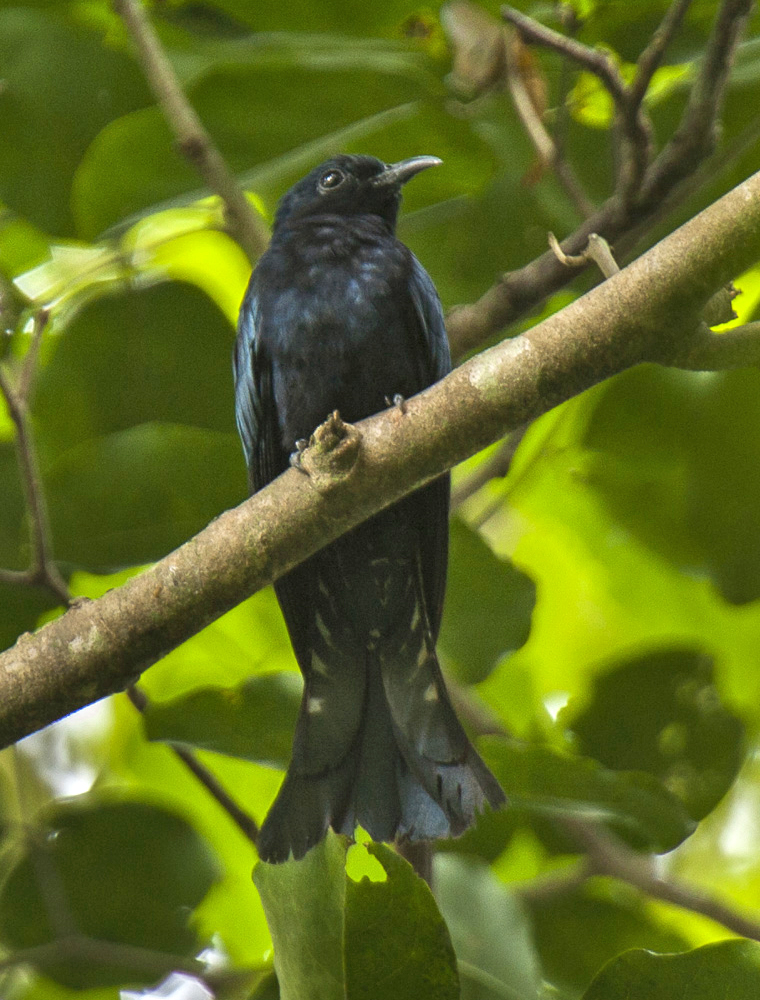

Conservation status
- Least Concern (IUCN 3.1)

Scientific classification
- Kingdom: Animalia
- Phylum: Chordata
- Class: Aves
- Order: Cuculiformes
- Family: Cuculidae
- Genus: Surniculus
- Species: S. velutinus

Binomial name
- Surniculus velutinus Sharpe, 1877

= Philippine drongo-cuckoo =

Species of bird

The Philippine drongo-cuckoo (Surniculus velutinus) is a bird of the cuckoo family found only in the Philippines. It was formerly a subspecies of the Square-tailed drongo-cuckoo. It is found in tropical moist lowland forest up to 1,000 meters above sea level. It is declining due to habitat loss.

== Description and taxonomy ==
It is 23 centimetres (9.1 in) long. The black bill is slender and curved and the tail is fairly long and slightly forked. The plumage is mostly glossy blue-black apart from a white bar on the underwing and white marks on the thigh feathers and on the underside of the tail. Young birds are duller than the adults but otherwise similar unlike young Square-tailed drongo-cuckoo which are spotted white. The call is a repeated series of 8 or 9 ascending notes.

It belongs to the genus Surniculus along with the Square-tailed drongo-cuckoo (S. lugubris). The two were previously classified as a single species but are now often separated based on differences in calls and juvenile plumage.

=== Subspecies ===
Two subspecies are recognized:

- S. v. velutinus – Found on Mindanao, Samar, Leyte, Bohol and the Mindanao
- S. v. chalybaeus – Found on Luzon, Panay and Negros.
- S. v. suluensis – Found on Sulu Archipelago

== Ecology and behavior ==
It inhabits the canopy and middle storey of lowland forest where it feeds on insects. . It is usually shy and solitary.

Nothing is known about its breeding habits, nest and fledgeling.

== Habitat and conservation status ==
Its natural habitats at tropical moist lowland primary forest, secondary forest and bamboo woodland up to 1,000 meters above sea level.

The IUCN has classified the species as being of Least Concern where it is said to be locally common. However, the population is believed to be declining due to deforestation from land conversion, Illegal logging and slash-and-burn farming.

Occurs in a many protected areas in Bataan National Park, Bulusan Volcano Natural Park, Angat Watershed Forest Reserve, Northern Sierra Madre Natural Park on Luzon, Pasonanca Natural Park, Mount Kitanglad, Mount Apo on Mindanao and Rajah Sikatuna Protected Landscape in Bohol and Samar Island Natural Park in Samar. While all of these areas are protected by law, deforestation, mining, hunting and habitat loss still continue in some of these protected areas.
