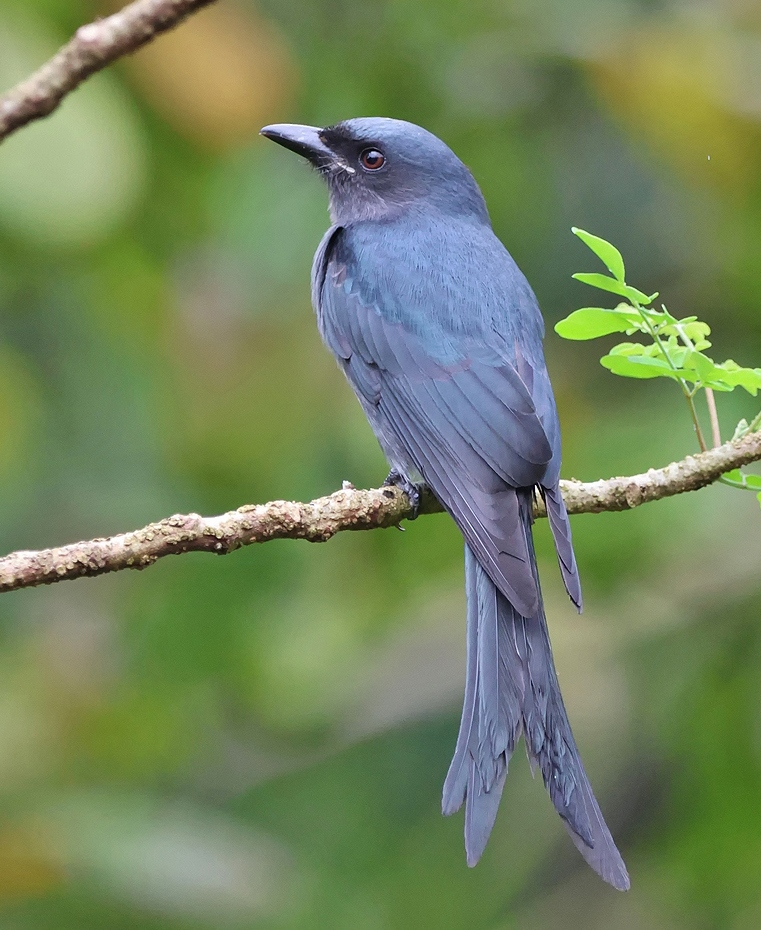
- D. m. macrocercus (South India)

Conservation status
- Least Concern (IUCN 3.1)

Scientific classification
- Kingdom: Animalia
- Phylum: Chordata
- Class: Aves
- Order: Passeriformes
- Family: Dicruridae
- Genus: Dicrurus
- Species: D. macrocercus

Binomial name
- Dicrurus macrocercus Vieillot, 1817

Subspecies
- D. m. macrocercus (Vieillot, 1817); D. m. albirictus (Hodgson, 1836); D. m. minor Blyth, 1850; D. m. cathoecus R. Swinhoe, 1871; D. m. thai Kloss, 1921; D. m. javanus Kloss, 1921; D. m. harterti Baker, 1918
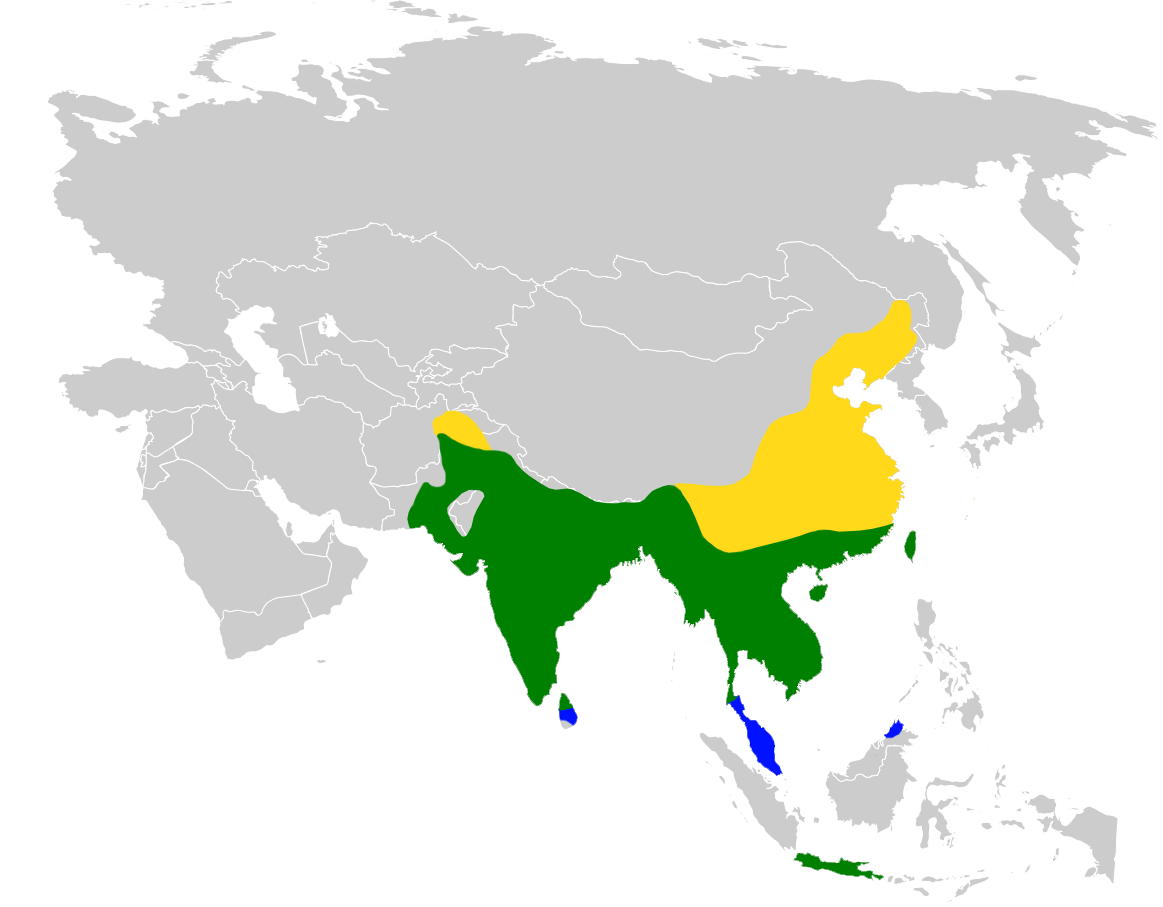
- Approximate range Breeding visitor Present year-round Winter visitor only

Synonyms
- Buchanga atra Bhuchanga albirictus

Audio

= Black drongo =

Species of bird

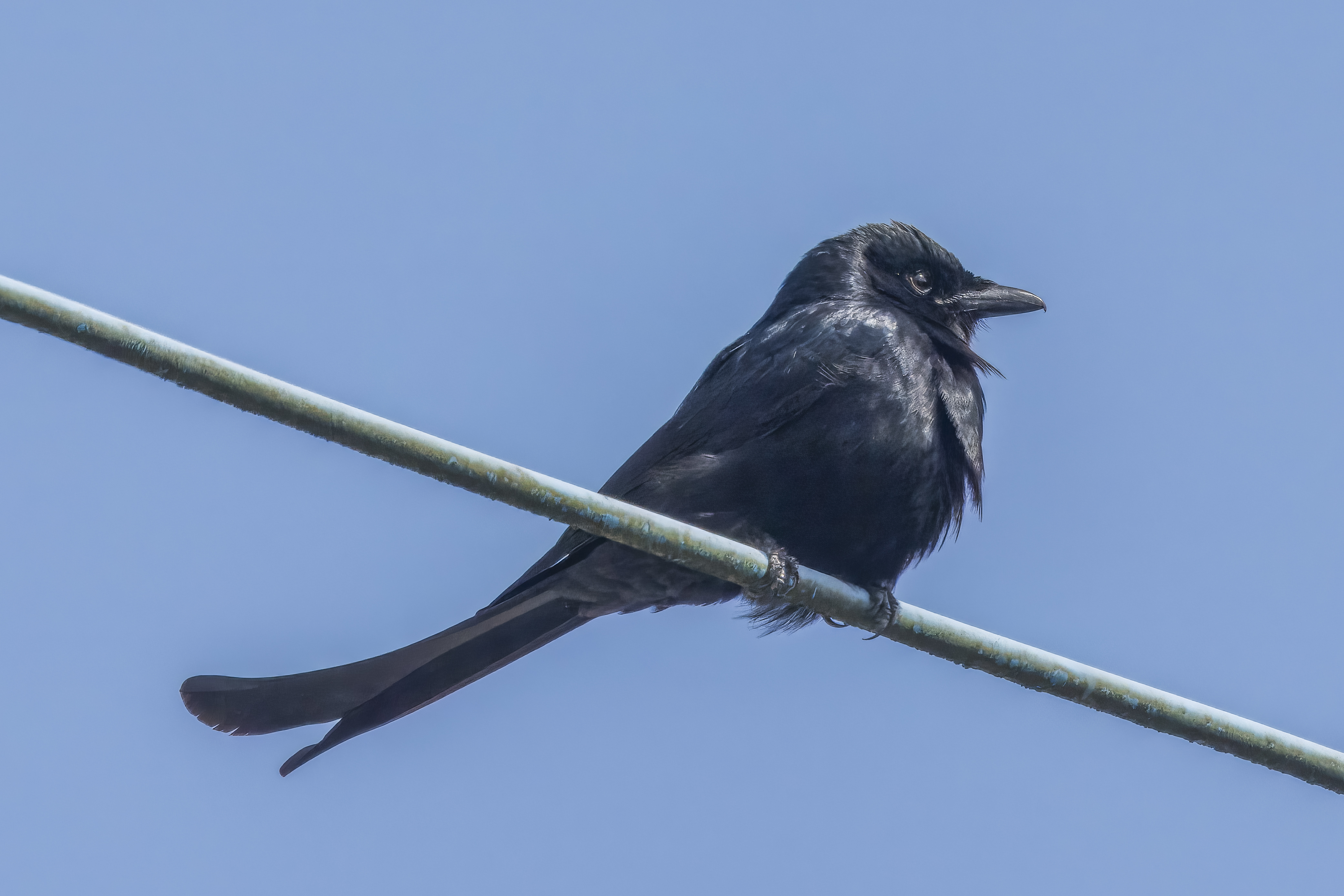
D. m. harterti, Taiwan

The black drongo (Dicrurus macrocercus) is a small Asian passerine bird of the drongo family Dicruridae. It is a common resident breeder in much of tropical southern Asia from southwest Iran through Pakistan, India, Bangladesh and Sri Lanka east to southern China and Indonesia and accidental visitor of Japan. It is an all black bird with a distinctive forked tail and measures 28 cm (11 in) in length. It feeds on insects, and is common in open agricultural areas and light forest throughout its range, perching conspicuously on a bare perch or along power or telephone lines.

The species is known for its aggressive behaviour towards much larger birds, such as crows, never hesitating to dive-bomb any bird of prey that invades its territory. This behaviour earns it the informal name of king crow. Smaller birds often nest in the well-guarded vicinity of a nesting black drongo. Previously grouped along with the African fork-tailed drongo (Dicrurus adsimilis), the Asian forms are now treated as a separate species with several distinct populations.

The black drongo is listed as least concern by the International Union for Conservation of Nature (IUCN) on the IUCN Red List, due to its large range and relative commonness. It has been introduced to some Pacific islands, where it has thrived and become abundant to the point of threatening and causing the extinction of native and endemic bird species there.

== Taxonomy and systematics ==
The black drongo was once considered a subspecies of the fork-tailed drongo (Dicrurus adsimilis), a close relative that diverged relatively recently. The two are now considered distinct species, with the fork-tailed drongo restricted to Africa and separated from the Asian range of the black drongo.

Seven subspecies have been named but the largely contiguous populations show clinal variation and intergrade with each other. Individuals from northern India (ssp. albirictus) are larger than those from the Sri Lankan population minor while those from the peninsular India (nominate subspecies) are intermediate in size. Race cathoecus is found in Thailand, Hong Kong and China. This race has a much smaller rictal spot and the wings are dark with a greenish gloss. In southern Siam a race thai is resident, but overlaps with wintering cathoecus. Race javanus is found on the islands of Java and Bali. Race harterti found in Formosa has the tail length less than the wing.

== Description ==
This bird is glossy black with a wide fork to the tail. Adults usually have a small white spot at the base of the gape. The iris is dark brown (not crimson as in the similar ashy drongo). The sexes cannot be told apart in the field. Juveniles are brownish and may have some white barring or speckling towards the belly and vent, and can be mistaken for the white-bellied drongo. First-year birds have white tips to the feathers of the belly, while second-years have these white-tipped feathers restricted to the vent.

They are aggressive and fearless birds, and although only 28 cm (11 in) in length, they will attack much larger species that enter their nesting territory, including crows and birds of prey. This behaviour led to their former name of king crow. They fly with strong flaps of the wing and are capable of fast manoeuvres that enable them to capture flying insects. With short legs, they sit upright on thorny bushes, bare perches or electricity wires. They may also perch on grazing animals.

They are capable of producing a wide range of calls but a common call is a two note tee-hee call resembling that of the shikra (Accipiter badius).

== Distribution and habitat ==
The black drongo is found predominantly in open country and usually perches and hunts close to the ground. They are mostly aerial predators of insects but also glean from the ground or off vegetation. They are found as summer visitors to northeastern Afghanistan and northern Pakistan but are residents from the Indus Valley until Bangladesh and into India and Sri Lanka. Some populations show seasonal movements that are poorly understood while populations in Korea are known to be migratory. The black drongo can be found in savanna, fields, and urban habitats.

Black drongos were introduced just before the Second World War from Taiwan to the island of Rota to help in the control of insects. It is believed that they dispersed over the sea to the island of Guam in the 1950s. By 1967, they were the fourth most commonly seen birds in roadside counts on Guam and are today the most abundant bird there. Predation by and competition from black drongos have been suggested as factors in the decline of endemic bird species such as the Rota bridled white-eye and the Guam flycatcher.

== Behaviour and ecology ==
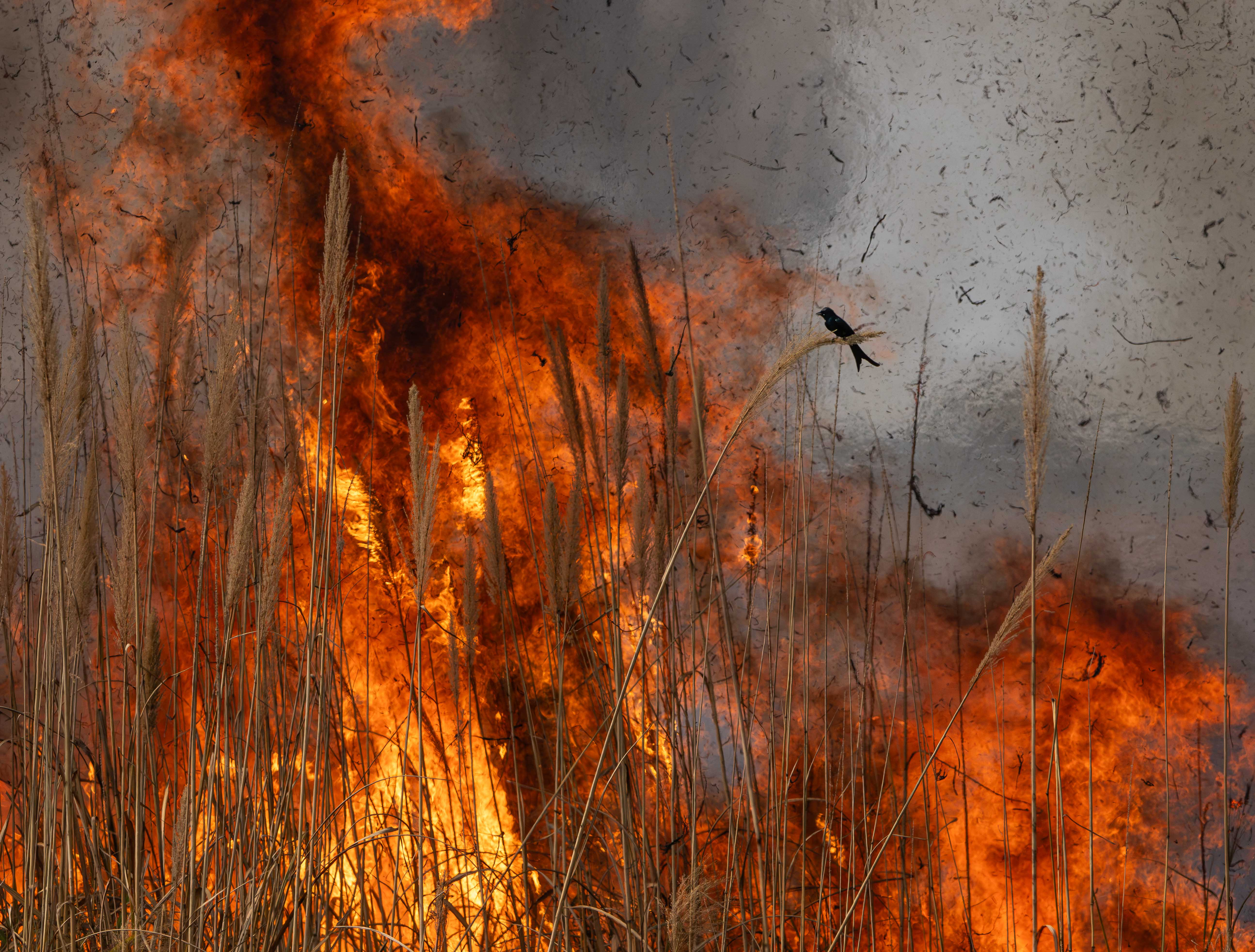
Black drongo foraging at the edge of fires

=== Food and foraging ===
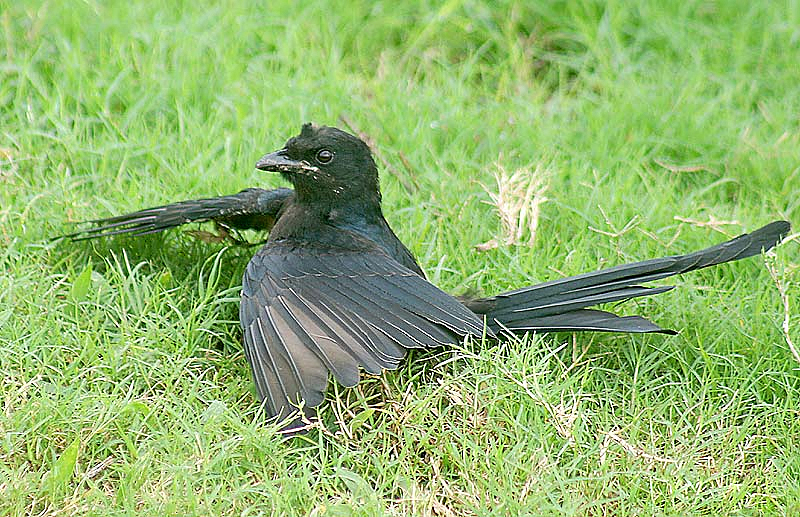
Black drongo sunning or possibly anting

Black drongos become active very early at dawn and roost later than many other birds. They feed mainly on insects such as grasshoppers, cicadas, termites, wasps, bees, ants, moths, beetles and dragonflies. They sometimes fly close to tree branches, attempting to disturb any insects that may be present. They congregate in fields being ploughed, picking up exposed caterpillars and beetle grubs. As many as 35 birds have been seen at such congregations. They are also attracted to fires in scrub and grasslands habitats where insects are disturbed. They appear to avoid flies. They associate with common mynas, cattle egrets and other birds that share a similar diet and habitat. Drongos benefit from this association and are more successful in their foraging. There is only partial overlap in the insect prey sought by mynas and drongos although in rare instances the drongos may rob prey from mynas. It is said that they imitate the call of the shikra so as to put mynas to flight and then to steal prey. Similar behaviour, using false alarm calls, has been noted in the fork-tailed drongo. There are some cases of the black drongo preying on small birds, reptiles, or maybe even bats. It has been suggested that they may feed on birds more intensively on migration. An individual on a migratory stop-over island in Korea caught several birds one after the other, killing them by striking at the back of the head and neck and feeding selectively on parts, especially the brain. They have also been on occasion seen feeding on fish. Flowers of trees such as Erythrina and Bombax may be visited for water and nectar and they are sometimes known to feed on grains. They are only rarely known to take larger arthropods such as scorpions and centipedes. They feed on milkweed butterflies that are often avoided by other predators and are known to feed late in the evening or night, often on insects attracted to artificial lights.

=== Nesting and breeding ===
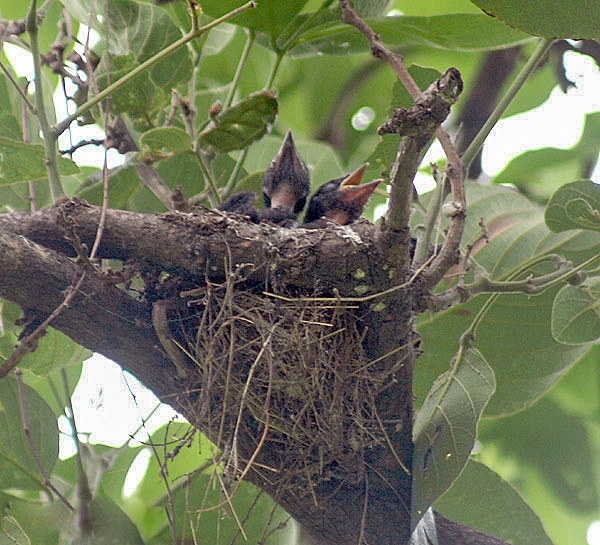
Nest in West Bengal

Black drongos breed mainly in February and March in southern India, and until August in other parts of the country. Males and females sing in the mornings during the breeding season. Courtship can include aerobatic chases and they may lock their wings and beaks together, with the pair sometimes falling to the ground. Displays may be made on the ground. Pair bonds are retained for a whole breeding season. The nest is a cup made with a thin layer of sticks placed in the fork of branch, and is built in a week by both the male and female. Eggs are laid close to the first rains in April. The usual clutch is three or rarely four eggs laid in a cup nest placed in the fork of an outer branch of tree. Large leafy trees such as the jackfruit are preferred. The eggs are pale cream to red with spots and markings and are 26 mm (1.0 in) long and 19 mm (0.75 in) wide. The eggs are incubated by both parents and hatch after 14 to 15 days. Nestlings are brooded for the first five days, after which the young are capable of maintaining a fairly constant body temperature. A second clutch may be laid if the first is destroyed. Nests are sometimes built in telephone poles. A nesting territory of 0.003 to 0.012 km^{2} (0.3 to 1.2 hectares) is maintained.

Helpers, offspring from the previous brood, have sometimes been noted to assist in feeding the fledglings at the nest of their parents. Cases of brood parasitism by the Asian koel have been noted. An average breeding success of 44% has been noted with the main cause of fledgling mortality being shortage of insect food which in turn was dependent on rainfall.

=== Mobbing and proximity nesting ===
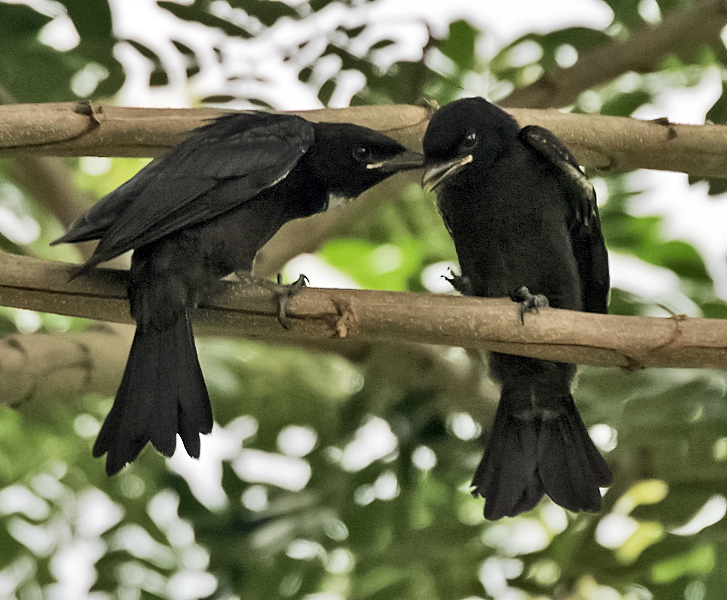
Fully fledged young yet to develop the forked tail

Their habit of driving away predators from near their nests is believed to encourage other birds such as orioles, doves, pigeons, babblers, and especially bulbuls, to nest in the vicinity. In one study 18 of 40 nests had red-vented bulbuls nesting within 10 metres (33 ft). An abnormal case of interspecific feeding with a red-vented bulbul feeding the chicks of a black drongo at their nest has been recorded.

It has been suggested that the Asian drongo-cuckoo (Surniculus lugubris) has evolved to mimic this species. The intensity of mobbing predators was studied in Java and observations showed that there was a significant increase in mobbing, during the nesting season, of some predators such as the Javan hawk-eagle but the black eagle, a nest predator is mobbed with equal intensity in all seasons. It has been suggested that this strategy may avoid giving away the location of nests during the breeding season.

=== Growth and development ===
Young birds have a yellowish-red gape. The feather follicles appear on the fourth day and pin feathers emerge after a week. Nestlings increase in weight steadily until they are 12 days old. The eyes open on the eighth day, the iris reddish-black while the gape turns red. The young leave the nest after about 16 to 20 days after hatching. They do not have the fork in the tail until three weeks. The parents continue to feed and protect them for a month. Young birds may beg for food for longer, but are often ignored or chased away by the adults. Birds reach breeding condition in about two years.

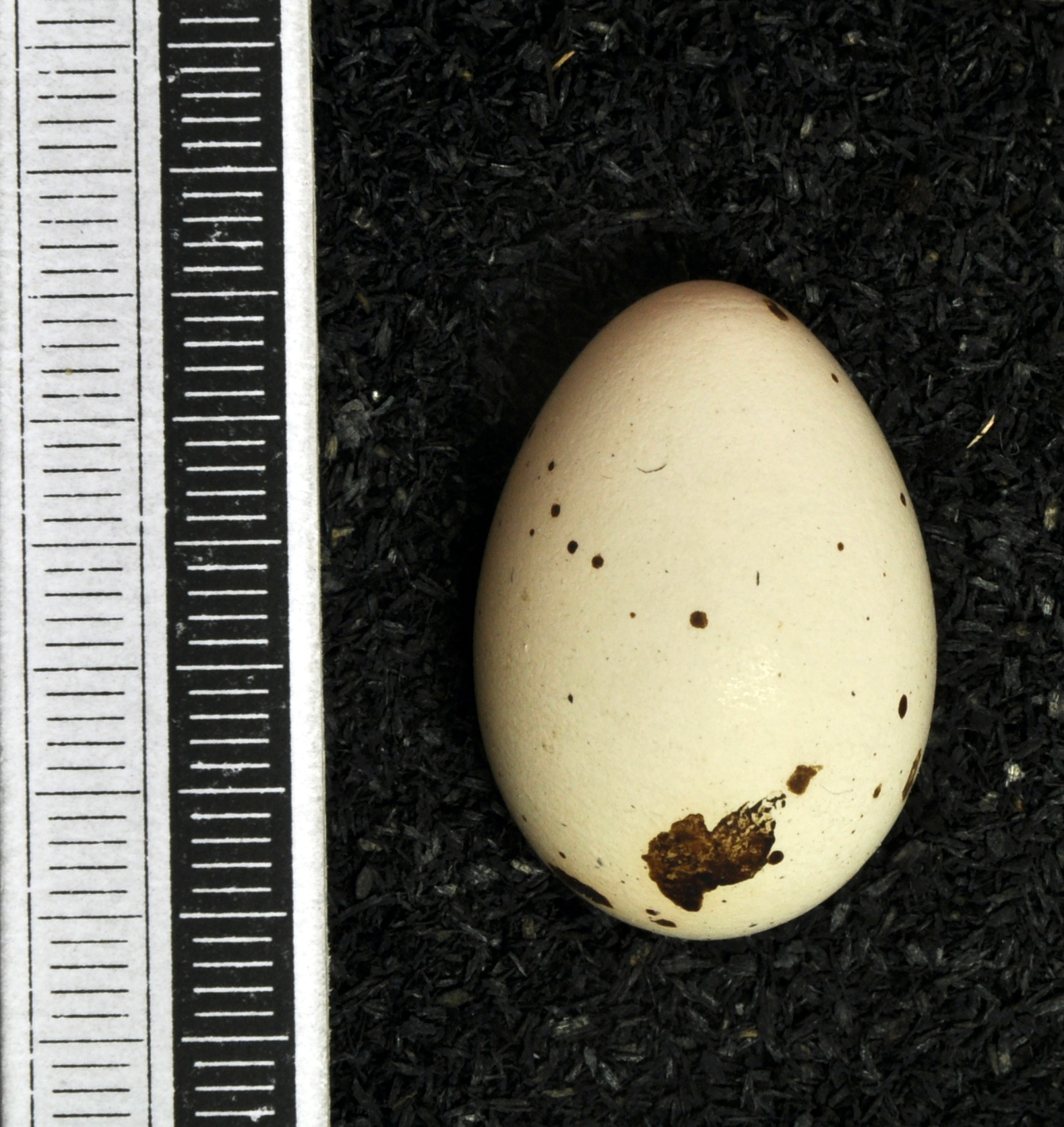
Egg, Collection Museum Wiesbaden

They are so aggressive that they may sometimes land on large birds of prey and peck them when mobbing.

Play behaviour has been observed with birds dropping a leaf in the air and catching it in mid-air and these may possibly help young birds acquire aerobatic skills.

In southern India, they moult their feathers from June to October. The wing moult begins in July with the first primary and proceeds towards the tenth. Secondaries are replaced from August after the primaries are at the third quill. The secondary moult is not orderly, the 8th and 7th being dropped earlier than the rest. The tail feathers are moulted centrifugally. Seasonal colour changes in the testicular tissues are caused by variation in melanin synthesis, with the dark pigmentation being lost during the breeding season.

=== Parasites and diseases ===
Many ectoparasitic bird lice (Myrsidea spp. and Menacanthus spp.), endoparasitic cestodes and nematodes have been described from this species. However no predators or diseases are significant factors in adult mortality.

== Relationship to humans ==
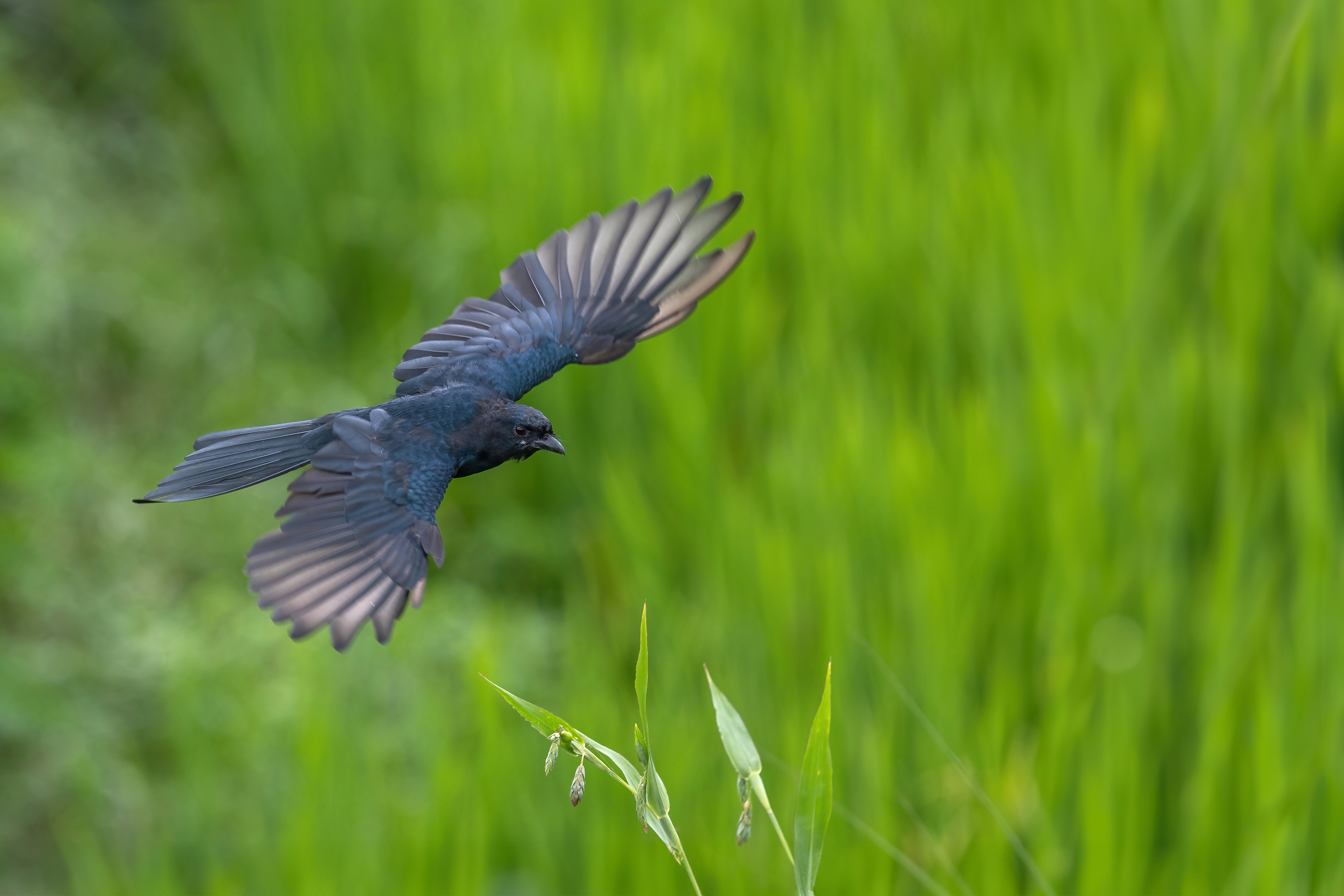
In flight, Nepal.

Their habit of preying on bees makes them a nuisance to beekeepers, but farmers attract them to their fields using artificial perches in fields to encourage them to feed on pest insects.

=== In culture ===
Being common, they have a wide range of local names. The older genus name of Buchanga was derived from the Hindi name of Bhujanga. Other local names include "srigunting hitam" in Indonesia, Thampal in Pakistan, Gohalo/Kolaho in Baluchistan, Kalkalachi in Sindhi, Kotwal (policeman) in Hindi; Finge or Finga in Bengali; Phesu in Assamese; Cheiroi in Manipuri; Kosita/Kalo koshi in Gujarati; Ghosia in Marathi; Kajalapati in Oriya; Kari kuruvi (charcoal bird), Erettai valan (two tail) in Tamil; Passala poli gadu in Telugu; Aanaranji (elephant snatcher) in Malayalam; Kari bhujanga in Kannada and Kalu Kawuda in Sinhalese. The soliga people do not differentiate this and the bronzed drongo, both being known as karaḷi but the greater racket-tailed drongo is called dodda karaḷi (or large karaḷi). A superstition in central India is that cattle would lose their horn if a newly fledged drongo alighted on it. It is held in reverence in parts of Punjab in the belief that it brought water to Husayn ibn Ali, revered by Shī'a Muslims.

== Other sources ==
- Bhujle BV, Nadkarni VB (1980). "Histological and histochemical observations on the adrenal gland of four species of birds, Dicrurus macrocercus (Vieillot), Centropus sinensis (Stephens), Sturnus pagodarum (Gmelin) and Columba livia (Gmelin)". Zoologische Beiträge. 26 (2): 287–295.
- Lamba, BS (1963) The nidification of some common Indian birds. 3. The Black Drongo (Dicrurus macrocercus Vieillot). Res. Bull. Panjab Univ. 14(1–2):1–9.
- Shukkur EAA, Joseph KJ (1980). "Annual rhythm in the Black Drongo Dicrurus adsimilis (family Dicruridae, Passeriformes, Aves)". Comparative Physiology and Ecology. 5 (2): 76–77.
- Shukkur, EAA (1978) Biology, Ecology and Behaviour of the Black Drongo (Dicrurus adsimilis). Thesis, University of Calicut.
