= MigrantWatch =

Non governmental organisation project

- Formation: July 2007
- Type: Citizen science project
- Legal status: Active
- Headquarters: India
- Region served: India
- Fields: Ornithology, bird migration, citizen science
- Parent organization: National Centre for Biological Sciences
- Affiliations: Indian Birds journal
- Website: migrantwatch.in

MigrantWatch is a citizen science non-governmental organisation project in India for collection of information about bird migration. The organisation was conceived in July 2007 and is coordinated by the Science Programme of the National Centre for Biological Sciences, in association with Indian Birds journal.

== History ==
The goal of the MigrantWatch programme is to collect information on the arrival, presence and departure of migrant birds that spend the winter in India and to assess any changes that occur in the timing of migration. The MigrantWatch program provides a website where registered members can upload observations of migratory bird species, and access all the sighting records and maps with data plotted.

In the first year, the program targeted nine species of migratory birds:

- Northern shoveller Anas clypeata
- Marsh harrier,\ Circus aeruginosus
- Wood sandpiper Tringa glareola
- Common (or barn) swallow Hirundo rustica
- Grey wagtail Motacilla cinerea
- Brown shrike Lanius cristatus
- Black redstart Phoenicurus ochruros
- Greenish warbler Phylloscopus trochiloides
- Rosy starling Sturnus roseus

Subsequently, the list was increased to 30 migratory species.
