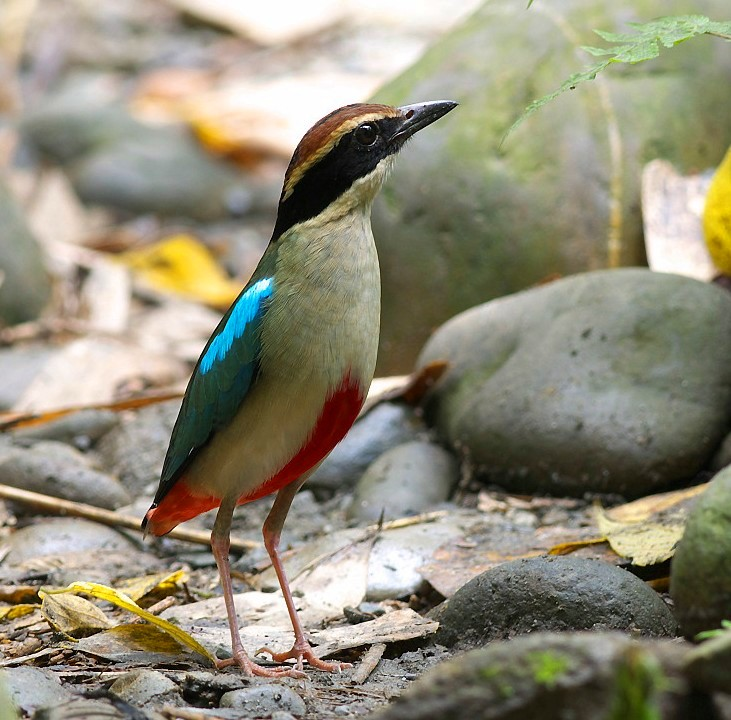
- in Taiwan

Conservation status
- Vulnerable (IUCN 3.1)
- CITES Appendix II

Scientific classification
- Kingdom: Animalia
- Phylum: Chordata
- Class: Aves
- Order: Passeriformes
- Family: Pittidae
- Genus: Pitta
- Species: P. nympha

Binomial name
- Pitta nympha Temminck & Schlegel, 1847

= Fairy pitta =

Species of bird

The fairy pitta (Pitta nympha) is a small and brightly colored species of passerine bird in the family Pittidae. Its diet mainly consists of earthworms, spiders, insects, slugs, and snails. The fairy pitta breeds in East Asia and migrates south to winter in Southeast Asia. Due to various habitat and anthropogenic disruptions, such as deforestation, wildfire, hunting, trapping, and cage-bird trade, the fairy pitta is rare and the population is declining in most places. Listed on the Convention on International Trade in Endangered Species of Wild Fauna and Flora (CITES) Appendix II, this bird is classified as vulnerable on the IUCN Red List of Threatened Species.

== Taxonomy ==
The fairy pitta is one of around 14 species in the genus Pitta. Within the genus, it is most closely related to the hooded pitta, with these two species forming a clade that is sister to the blue-winged pitta.

The fairy pitta was first described in 1847. It was formerly considered to be conspecific with the Indian pitta, but it has since been split due to differences in plumage, morphology, and vocalization. The generic name Pitta is from the Telugu word pitta, meaning a pretty bauble or pet, while the specific epithet nympha is from the Latin word nympha, meaning nymph. Alternative names for the species include lesser blue-winged pitta, Chinese pitta, little forest angel, and eight-coloured bird.

The species is monotypic. In contemporary taxonomy, the fairy pitta forms a superspecies with the Indian pitta, mangrove pitta (P. megarhyncha) and blue-winged pitta (P. moluccensis). The fairy pitta is the most northerly species of pitta and is the only species breeding in northeast Asia.

== Description ==
The fairy pitta has a body length of 16–19.5 cm (6.3–7.7 in) and is easily discernible for its plumage of seven different colors reminiscent of a rainbow. Its back and wing bows are green, scapulars and upper tail coverts are green and cobalt. There is a blue rump on upper tail coverts. The tail is dark green with a cobalt tip, and the tarsi are yellowish brown.

The fairy pitta has different colors of wing coverts as well. Its primary coverts are dark blue, secondary coverts are greenish blue, greater and middle coverts are dark green, and lesser coverts are cobalt or bright blue. The bird's white patch on each of their brownish-black primaries are noticeable when it flies. Its lower body, including nape, chest, and side, is cream-colored, except for the lower belly and undertail coverts, which are red. The bird has a chestnut crown. From its forehead to the back of its head is mantled with brown plumage, whereas its median is striped with black from lores to nape. The off-white supercilia extend across the nape. The fairy pitta has a white throat and a black beak.

A species with a similar appearance is the blue-winged pitta, which is larger than the fairy pitta. The blue-winged pitta has buff crown sides and supercilia, rather than the chestnut of the fairy pitta, brighter upper tail coverts, darker yellowish brown belly, and vivid blue on upper wing coverts.

The song of the fairy pitta is clear and whistled kwah-he kwa-wu, which is similar to that of the blue-winged pitta, but longer and slower.

== Distribution and habitat ==
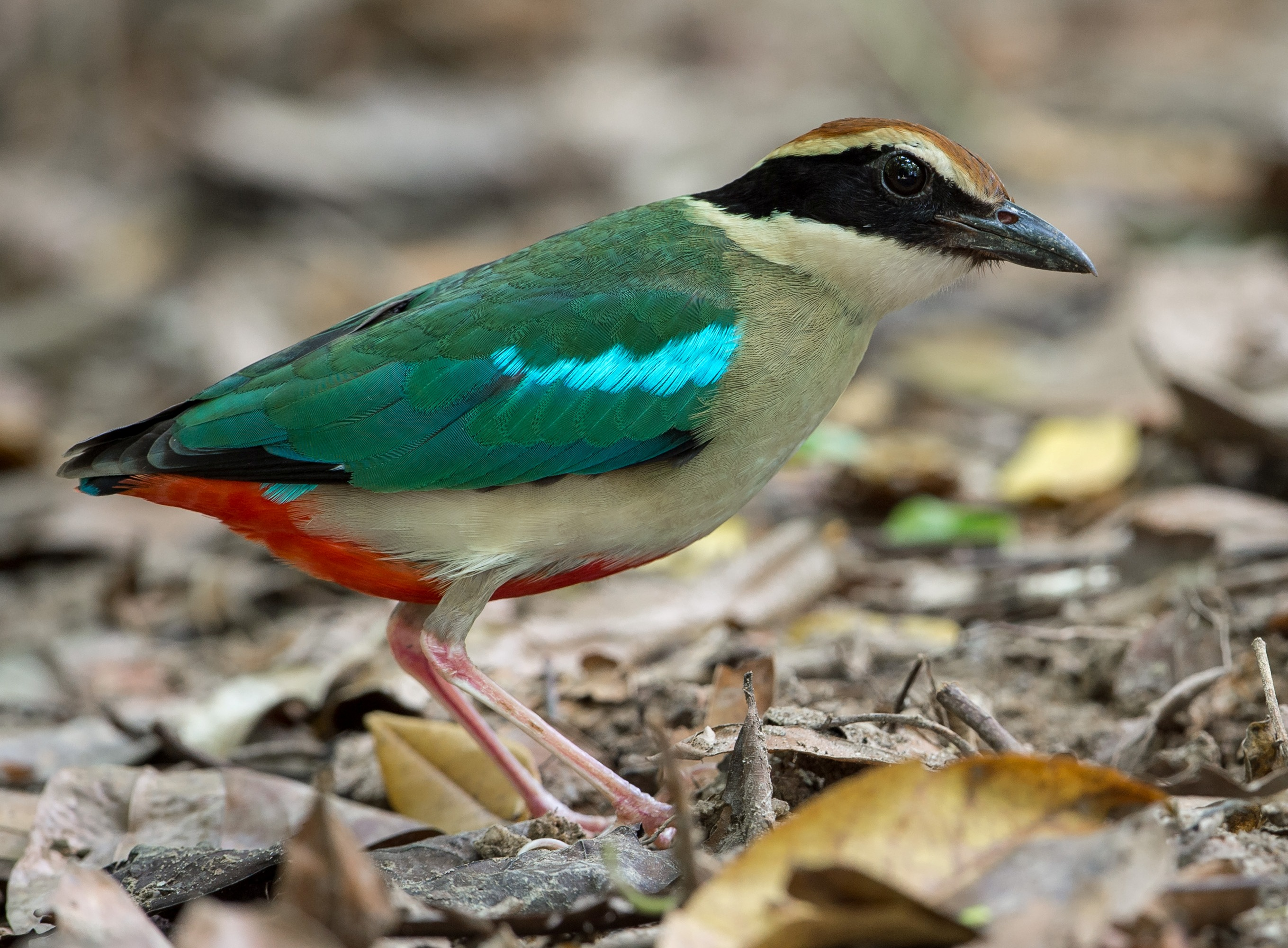
Fairy pitta in southern Thailand

The fairy pitta is a migratory species and travels from Northeast Asia, where it breeds in summer (April–September) to South and Southeast Asia to spend the winter (October–March). Sightings have been reported from India and Indochina, including both the Bruneian and Kalimantan sides of the island of Borneo, and New Guinea, as well as in China, North Korea, South Korea, and Taiwan. Recorded stopovers are in North Korea, Vietnam, Hong Kong, the Philippines, and Thailand. Following the same migratory routes in both spring and autumn every year, the majority of passages occur in April and September to October. Even though the bird is fairly widespread throughout the eastern part of Asia, the fact that it is highly localized in subtropical forests suggests that the fairy pitta is faithful to wintering sites and requires specific habitat conditions.

The fairy pitta leaving from Borneo in spring arrives in the Korean Peninsula in early or mid-May and departs back to south in October. However, migrations occur throughout the country in spring and winter. The fairy pitta breeds on the coasts, islands, or in dense and moist deciduous forests, such as camellia forest, in Hwanghae Province, Gyeonggi Province, South Gyeongsang Province, and South Jeolla Province. Among those habitats, the fairy pitta mostly prefers islands off the southern part of Korea. Especially in Geoje in South Gyeongsang Province and Jeju Island, regular visits of the fairy pitta to the same locations have been reported. In Jeju Island alone, more than 60 pairs are thought to be breeding regularly in the altitude of 100 m to 600 m in Halla Mountain, making the island the most important breeding ground in South Korea. Subspecies in the Korean Peninsula is distributed to East China, as far as to the Shandong Peninsula, and limited regions in Taiwan.

In Japan, the fairy pitta arrives at both the Sea of Japan and the Pacific sides of southern Japan, including the islands of Kyushu, Honshu, Shikoku, Tsushima, with notable populations in Miyazaki Prefecture, Kōchi Prefecture, Hiroshima Prefecture, and as far north as Hokkaido, in mid-May. Similar to the groups breeding in Korea, the fairy pitta in Japan favors places with dense undergrowth of bushes, ferns, scrub, and grass, but with good visibility to be aware of predators or disturbances. The bird here exclusively nests in coastal deciduous evergreen forests. In 1991, 93.5% of the breeding sites were found in broadleaf evergreen or deciduous forest, whereas only 6.5% were in mixed coniferous-broadleaf forest. In recent years, however, a trend of the fairy pitta nesting in plantations has been noticed. In Kōchi Prefecture, for instance, the fairy pitta prefers Japanese red pine (Pinus densiflora) forest during the early days of its breeding season. The fairy pitta in Japan mostly dwells on hill slopes below the altitude of 500 m, but occasional recordings indicate that some pairs live at altitudes as high as 1,200 m.

In Taiwan, the species was similarly found to favor areas covered with thick crown layer, variety of trees, no shrub or vine near the nest, and steep slopes that prevent intrusion of other animals. Arriving in mid to late April, the bird is usually spotted in the central and western regions, where much of the land is hilly or mountainous, at altitudes no higher than 1,300 m.

In China, the fairy pitta seems to be widely distributed in the mountains in the southeast, in mixed forests at altitudes between 500 m and 1,500 m. The same preference extends to Hong Kong, where the bird stops along its course of migrations.

== Behavior ==
The fairy pitta is a territorial bird, and the male defends its territory through calls. Its general habit is however secretive. From mid-May to early June, sometimes to late July, it likes to perch on a high tree branch in a posture resembling that of a kingfisher. However, the fairy pitta tends to repeatedly shake its tail up and down while singing on a branch.

=== Diet and feeding ===
The fairy pitta mostly feeds on the ground, wandering solitarily. Its diet largely consists of earthworms of several species, beetles, and other hard-shelled insects. A variety of other small animals such as lepidoptera larvae and adults, spiders, snails, lizards, frogs, small snakes, and shrews, occasionally form part of its diet. Earthworms make up 73%–82% of the diet fed to the nestlings, followed by homoptera larvae (4%–8.6%). Although not entirely identifiable, lepidopteran adults and pupae likely make up 11% of the nestling diet. The fairy pitta's preference for earthworms with their high energy content makes the abundance of this food item critical for nesting success.

=== Reproduction ===
The fairy pitta makes a relatively large nest in the dark place, such as in the crevice between rocks in thick broadleaf forest or foliage on a slope, 1–5 m above the ground. The entrance is lined with cattle dung and the nest itself is lined with lichen. If necessary, the male aggressively defends the nest, chases after and attacking intruders. Such defensive behavior is only displayed until the eggs are laid.

The female lays from 4 to 6 eggs per bredding attempt, from May to mid-July. The egg has a light gray background with small light brownish purple and grey dots, and is 25–27.5 mm in the major axis and 19–22.5 mm in the minor axis. Both male and female incubate the eggs; the female usually feeds the hatchlings, while the male keeps watch. In the first 4 days after hatching, the fairy pitta rarely leaves the nest. This is probably because temperatures are low during the rainy season and the nestling hatches without any down feathers. The nestling has its first plumage within 14 days after hatching. Throughout the breeding season, the adult bird rarely goes farther than 100–400 m from the nest. In June or July, the chick fledges, but the rearing continues until the nestling is ready to migrate south. The average reproductive success of the fairy pitta is 41.9%.

=== Mortality ===
The predators most affecting the reproductive success of the fairy pitta are snakes, followed by mammals such as macaques, cats and weasels. The raiding of nests by jungle crows (Corvus macrorhynchos) and cat snakes during breeding season has also been reported frequently. During migrations, the bird is exposed to danger from falcons. The rate at which adult fairy pittas return from the wintering grounds appears to be 16–26%; most casualties happening on the bird's northward migrating and during breeding seasons from May to July. Fewer birds are lost during the autumn migration in October. Another cause of mortality is window strikes. As for many other species of bird, casualties from human-bird interaction are identified as a leading cause of decline in the fairy pitta.

== Status and conservation ==
=== Population trend and threats ===
There is no very accurate estimate of total population size of the species. Estimated numbers include ranges of 100 to 10,000 breeding pairs and 50 to 1,000 migrating individuals respectively in China, Korea, Japan, and Taiwan; total population size is thought to be somewhere between a few thousand and a few tens of thousands of individuals. Although researchers estimate that the largest number of birds survive in China, no concrete study has been done. However, a worldwide trend of decline in the fairy pitta is clear enough to lead to a classification of the species as vulnerable on the IUCN Red List of Threatened Species and as endangered in CITES Appendix II. The main causes for the decline are habitat loss, trapping, hunting, and human disturbances.

The causes of habitat disruption, which encompasses deforestation in the bird's breeding range, are essentially the results of human activity, but the characteristics of threats vary from one region to another. In Japan, where the fairy pitta was originally more common, significant areas of forest have been cleared since the 19th century for fuel and throughout the 20th century for the building of plantations. Since the logging has ceased and old growth forests have begun to recover, the fairy pitta population is expected to gradually increase. In contrast, vast forested areas in Southeast China have in the last 50 years been clear-cut or converted due to an increased demand for timber and farmland. There is also a lack of control of forest fires. In Borneo, a fairy pitta wintering ground, the continuing destruction of the Sundaic lowland primeval forest is more devastating. It is one of the most important Biodiversity hotspots in the world, but the deforestation is ongoing even in the protected areas and jeopardizing not only the fairy pitta, but also many other tropical species. Large scale developments also endanger local populations. In Yunlin County, Taiwan, the largest known breeding group of the species is being severely impacted by the flooding from the Hushan Dam project. Despite the imminent threats that the fairy pitta is facing in Taiwan, however, quantitative data on the impact of human disturbance on the population remains limited, undermining the conservation efforts.

The threat of hunting has been prevalent in Guangxi, China and Taiwan. Particularly in Taiwan, specimen-collecting and cage-bird trading are thought to have severely reduced the local breeding population in the 20th century. However, as more conservation efforts are made and the significance of the fairy pitta is recognized locally, hunting is expected to diminish.

Human disturbances also directly affect individual fairy pittas. In Jeju Island, South Korea, window strikes are one of the leading factors endangering the bird. As more buildings are built in the vicinity of breeding sites, accidental window strikes have consequently increased. Moreover, in Taiwan as well as in Jeju Island, many nests are disturbed by hikers, amateur photographers, birdwatchers, and researchers, which may alter the bird's behavior and increase nest predation risk.

On a meta-population level, it is thought that the fairy pitta's relatively narrow distribution in Northeast Asia and the species' regionally specific breeding and wintering grounds are lowering the genetic diversity and fragment the genetic structure of populations. Although more research is needed, this is suspected to compromise its fitness.

=== Conservation measures ===
As a response to rapidly declining populations in most areas, an increasing number of studies has focused on the fairy pitta in recent years, and the species is now protected under various national conservation laws. The fairy pitta is classified as a Nationally Protected Species in China, Category II protected species in Taiwan, National Endangered Species in Japan, Category I protected species in North Korea, and a Natural Monument in South Korea. Many pairs benefit from breeding in national parks or reserves that were initially designed to protect other species.

Conservation of the fairy pitta requires measures specific to local levels and international cooperation, since the species is exposed to various threats during migration and stopovers. It has been suggested that more surveys of breeding sites, population sizes, and distribution of the bird be conducted along with research into its ecology, current conservation measures in parks, and the need for more sanctuaries. Enforced management of existing protected forests and restrictions on hunting and trapping are critical for saving the species. Specific measures for individual regions have been proposed. On Jeju Island, for instance, it has been advised that developments – including the construction of buildings, golf courses, roads, and trails – in forested or near breeding areas be regulated, and that a predator control program reducing the number of jungle crows and Eurasian magpies (Pica pica) should be considered.
