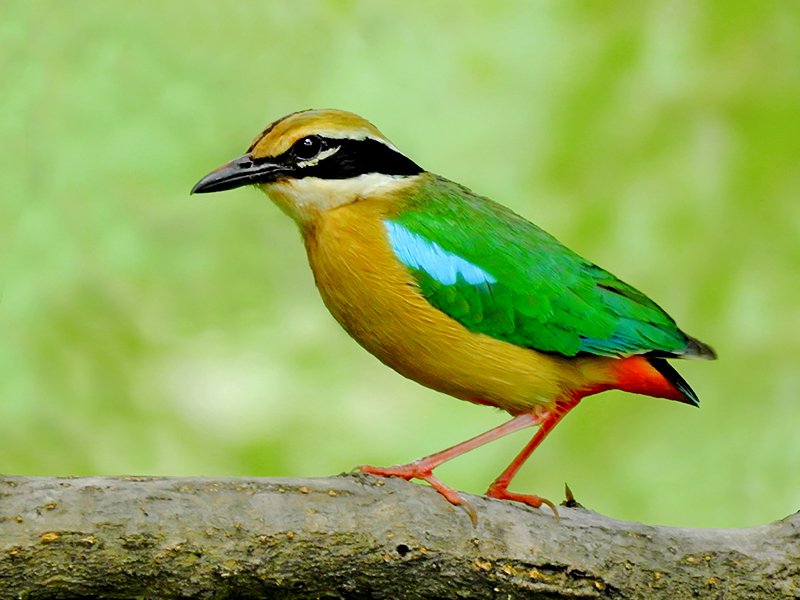
- Indian pitta in Maharashtra, India Call

Conservation status
- Least Concern (IUCN 3.1)

Scientific classification
- Kingdom: Animalia
- Phylum: Chordata
- Class: Aves
- Order: Passeriformes
- Family: Pittidae
- Genus: Pitta
- Species: P. brachyura

Binomial name
- Pitta brachyura (Linnaeus, 1766)

Synonyms
- Corvus brachyurus Linnaeus, 1766

= Indian pitta =

Species of bird

Pitta brachyura in Ajodhya Hills, West Bengal, India.

The Indian pitta (Pitta brachyura) also known as Navrang, is a passerine bird native to the Indian subcontinent. It inhabits scrub jungle, deciduous and dense evergreen forest. It breeds in the forests of the Himalayas, hills of central and western India, and migrates to other parts of the peninsula in winter. Although very colourful, it is usually shy and hidden in the undergrowth where it picks insects on the forest floor. It has a distinctive two note whistling call which is heard at dawn and dusk. It is listed as least concern on the IUCN Red List as the population is considered large.

== Taxonomy ==
The Indian pitta was first known in England after an illustration by an Indian artist was sent by Edward Bulkley to James Petiver and given the name of "Ponnunky pitta". This illustration was included by William Derham at the end of John Ray's posthumous Synopsis methodica avium which was published in 1713. The bird was again described and illustrated by Mathurin Jacques Brisson in 1760 and George Edwards in 1764. The Latin names coined by Brisson do not conform to the binomial nomenclature and are not recognised by the International Commission on Zoological Nomenclature. When in 1766 Carl Linnaeus updated his Systema Naturae for the twelfth edition he included the Indian pitta, cited the earlier publications and coined the binomial name Corvus brachyura. Linnaeus specified the type location as "Moluccis" and "Zeylona". The Maluku Islands is an error as the Indian pitta does not occur there. The generic name Pitta was proposed by Louis Pierre Vieillot in 1816 for birds with a short tail, a straight pointed beak and long wing feathers. It is a monotypic species.

=== Etymology ===
The word 'pitta' is derived from the Telugu language meaning 'small bird'. The specific name brachyura is a combination of the classical Greek words βραχυς brakhus 'short' and -ουρος -ouros '-tailed'.

Local names in India are based on the colours and behaviours like the time of calling and these include Hindi: Naorang, Punjabi: Nauranga (=Nine colours), Bengali: Shumcha, Cachar: Dao bui yegashi, Gujarati: Navaranga or Hariyo; Tamil: Kaachul, Aru-mani kuruvi (=6-O'Clock bird), Kathelachi, Thotta kallan; Telugu: Polanki pitta, Ponnangi pitta; Malayalam: Kavi; Kannada: Navaranga and Sinhala: Avichchiya. The Sinhala interpretation of its call is that the bird is complaining about the theft of its dress by a peacock: Evith giya, evith giya, ayith kiyannam, methe budun buduwana vita ayith kiyannam, which translates as: "Came and went! Came and went! I'll still be complaining when the next Buddha comes! I'll still be complaining!"

== Description ==
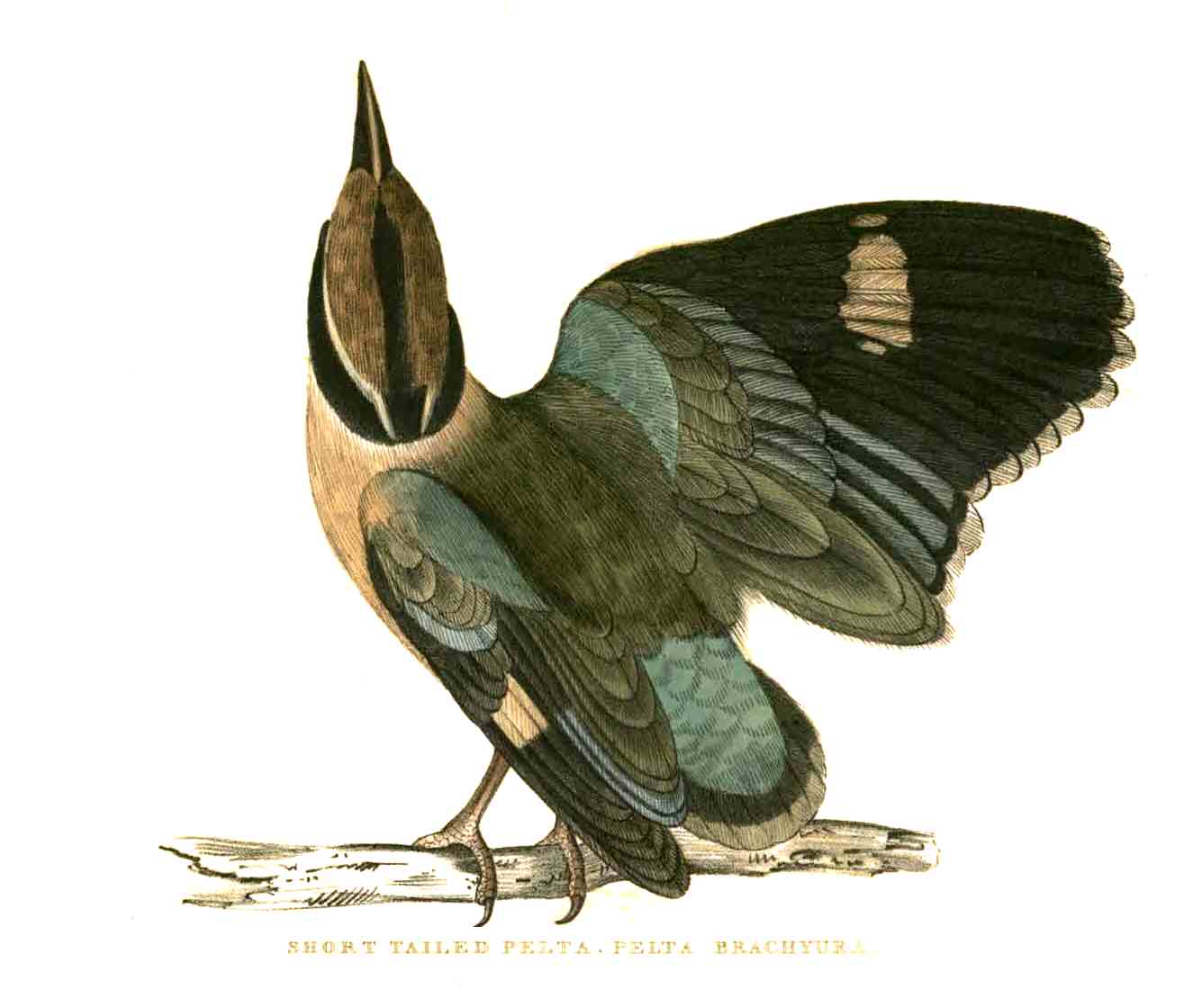
Thomas Hardwicke's illustration - "short-tailed pelta" (1834)

The Indian pitta is a small stubby-tailed bird that is mostly seen on the floor of forests or under dense undergrowth, foraging on insects in leaf litter. It has long, strong legs, a very short tail and stout bill, with a buff-coloured crown stripe, black coronal stripes, a thick black eye stripe and white throat and neck. The upper parts are green, with a blue tail, the underparts buff, with bright red on the lower belly and vent. The bird hops on the ground to forage and has been known to get trapped in ground traps meant for small mammals. It has been suggested that the width of the coronal stripe may differ between the sexes.

It is more often heard than seen and has a distinctive loud two-note whistle wheeet-tieu or wieet-pyou or sometimes, a triple note hh-wit-wiyu. They also have a single note-mewing call. They have a habit of calling once or twice, often with neighbouring individuals joining in, at dawn or dusk leading to their common name of "Six-O-Clock" bird in Tamil. When calling the head is thrown back and the bill is pointed upwards.

Pittas are among the few Old World suboscine birds. The Indian pitta is the basal member of a distinct clade that includes many of the Oriental species. It forms a superspecies with the fairy pitta (P. nympha), mangrove pitta (P. megarhyncha) and blue-winged pitta (P. moluccensis).

== Distribution and habitat ==
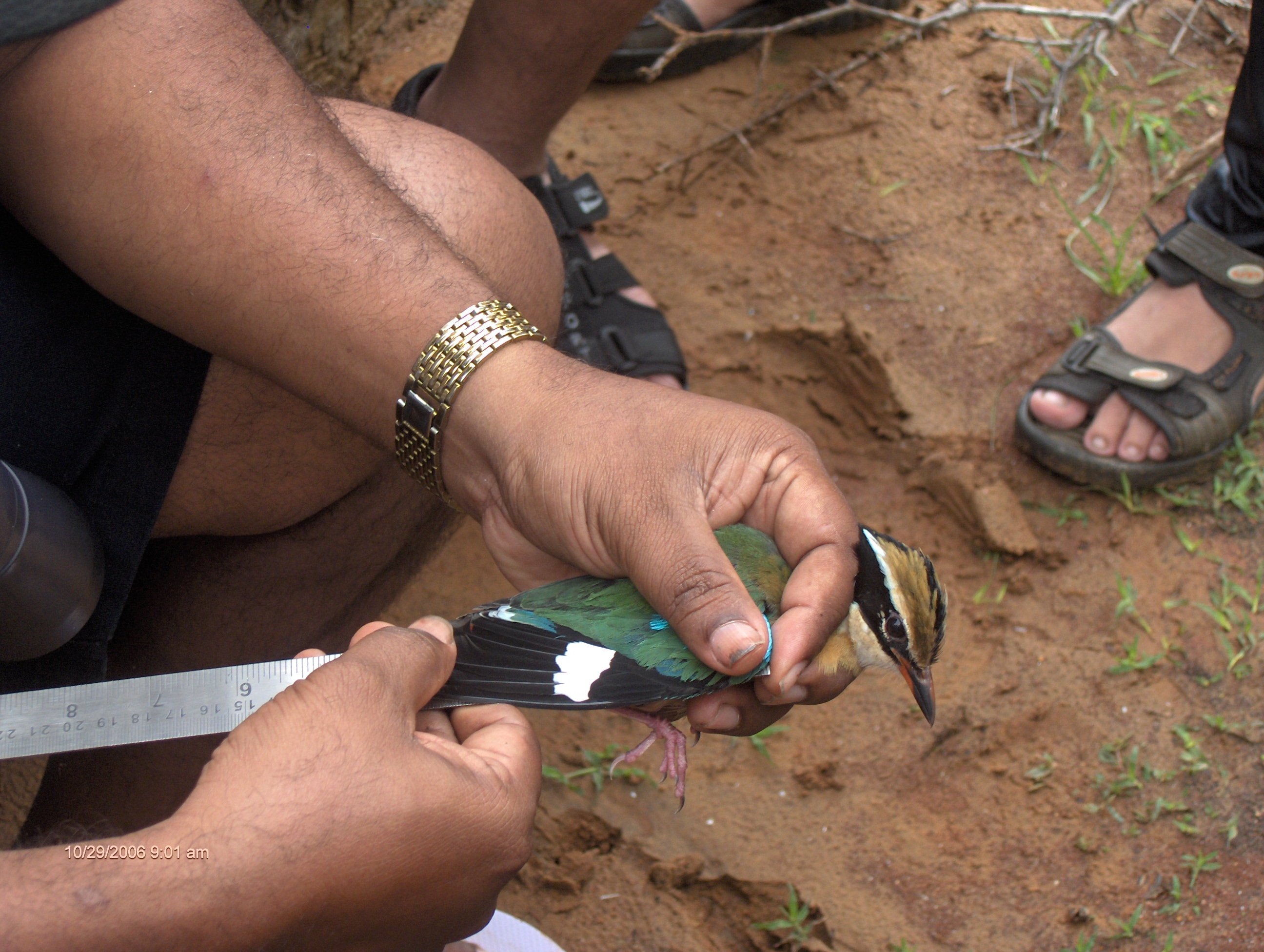
A bird being measured at Point Calimere

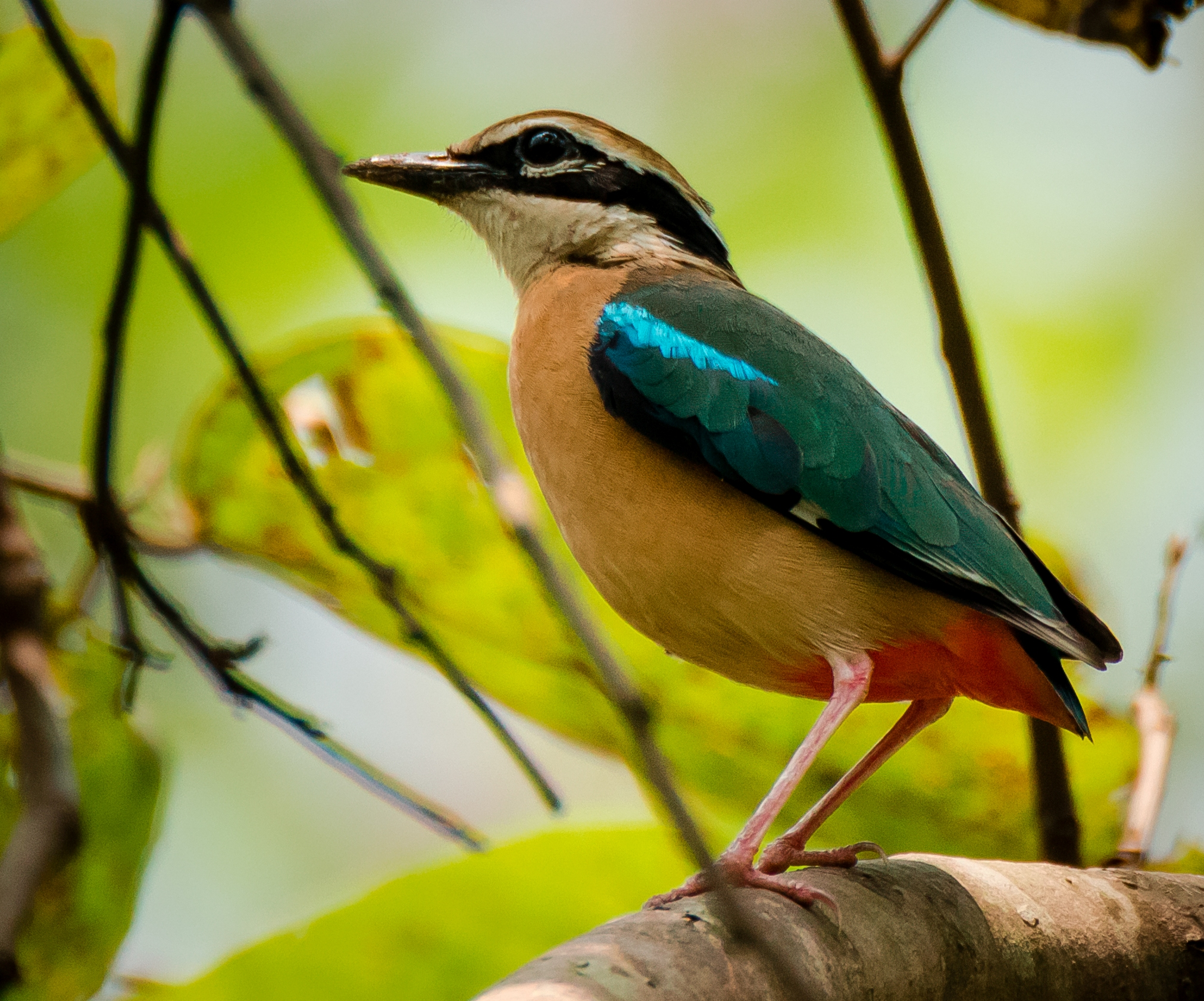
Indian pitta in Kadigarh National Park, Bhaluka

The Indian pitta breeds mainly in the Himalayan foothills from the Margalla hills in northern Pakistan to Nepal and possibly up to Sikkim in the east, and in the hills of central India and in the Western Ghats south to Karnataka. It migrates to all parts of peninsular India and Sri Lanka in winter. Exhausted birds sometimes turn up in human settlements. It is rare in the Thar Desert.

== Ecology and behaviour ==
Indian pittas roost in trees. They feed on insects and other small invertebrates that they usually pick up from the ground or leaf litter. They have also been noted to take kitchen food scraps from the ground.

They breed during the south-west monsoon from June to August, with peaks in June in central India, and in July in northern India. The nest is a globular structure with a circular opening on one side built on the ground or on low branches. It is made up of dry leaves and grasses. The clutch is four to five eggs which are very glossy white and spherical with spots and speckles of deep maroon or purple.

Avian malaria parasites have been noted in the species. Five out of thirteen birds in an ectoparasite survey were found to have the tick, Haemaphysalis spinigera.

Their seasonal movements associated with the rains have not been well studied.

== Other sources ==
- Donald, C. H. (1918). "The occurrence of the Indian Pitta Pitta brachyura in the Kangra District, Punjab". Journal of the Bombay Natural History Society. 25 (3): 497–499.
- Ingalhalikar, S. (1977). "Indian Pitta in captivity". Newsletter for Birdwatchers. 17 (7): 8–9.
- Bolster, R. C. (1921). "Breeding of the Indian Pitta". Journal of the Bombay Natural History Society. 28 (1): 284.
