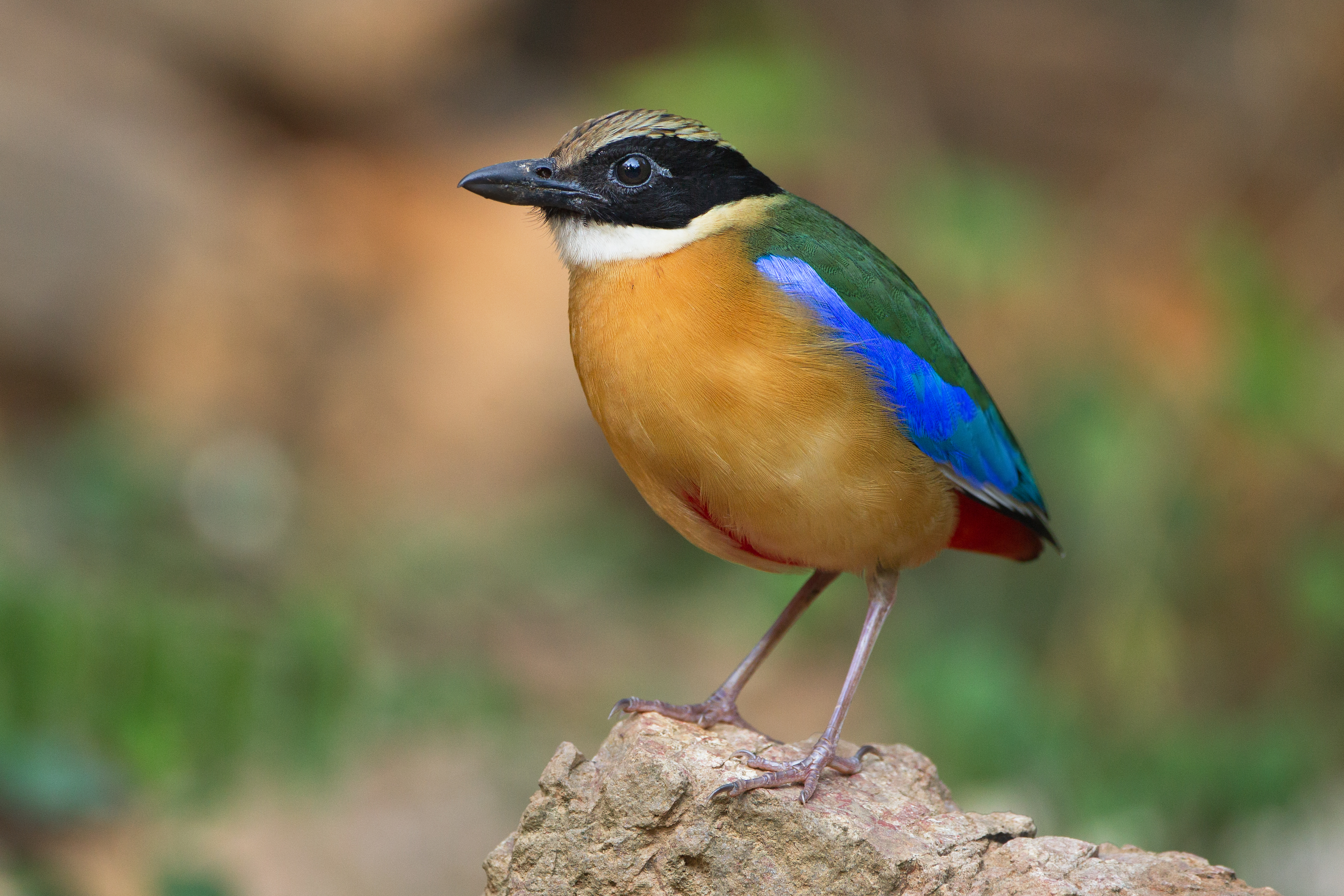

Conservation status
- Least Concern (IUCN 3.1)

Scientific classification
- Kingdom: Animalia
- Phylum: Chordata
- Class: Aves
- Order: Passeriformes
- Family: Pittidae
- Genus: Pitta
- Species: P. moluccensis

Binomial name
- Pitta moluccensis (Statius Müller, 1776)

Audio

= Blue-winged pitta =

Species of bird

The blue-winged pitta (Pitta moluccensis) is a passerine bird in the family Pittidae. It forms a superspecies with three other pittas, the Indian pitta (P. brachyura), the fairy pitta (P. nympha) and the mangrove pitta (P. megarhyncha). A colourful bird, it has a black head with a buff stripe above the eye, a white collar, greenish upper parts, blue wings, buff underparts and a reddish vent area. Its range extends from India to Malaysia, Indonesia, southern China and the Philippines. Its habitat is moist woodland, parks and gardens and it avoids dense forest. It feeds mainly on insects and worms. It breeds in the spring, building an untidy spherical nest on the ground, often near water and between tree roots. A clutch of about five eggs is laid and incubated by both parents, hatching after about sixteen days.

== Taxonomy ==
The blue-winged pitta was described by the German naturalist Philipp Ludwig Statius Müller in 1776 and given the binomial name Turdus moluccensis. Statius Müller's description was based on a plate showing the "Merle des Moluques" published by Comte de Buffon in his Planches Enluminées D'Histoire Naturelle. The French name and the specific epithet moluccensis refer to the Moluccas (the Maluku Islands). This was an error as the range of the species does not extend as far east. The type locality was amended in 1963 to Malacca on the Malay Peninsula. The species is now placed in the genus Pitta that was introduced by the French ornithologist Louis Pierre Vieillot in 1816. The species is monotypic.

The blue-winged pitta forms a superspecies with the Indian pitta (P. brachyura), fairy pitta (P. nympha) and mangrove pitta (P. megarhyncha). Alternate common names include: lesser blue-winged pitta, the little blue-winged pitta, the Moluccan pitta, the brève à ailes bleues (French), the Kleine Blauflügelpitta (German) and the pita aliazul (Spanish).

== Description ==
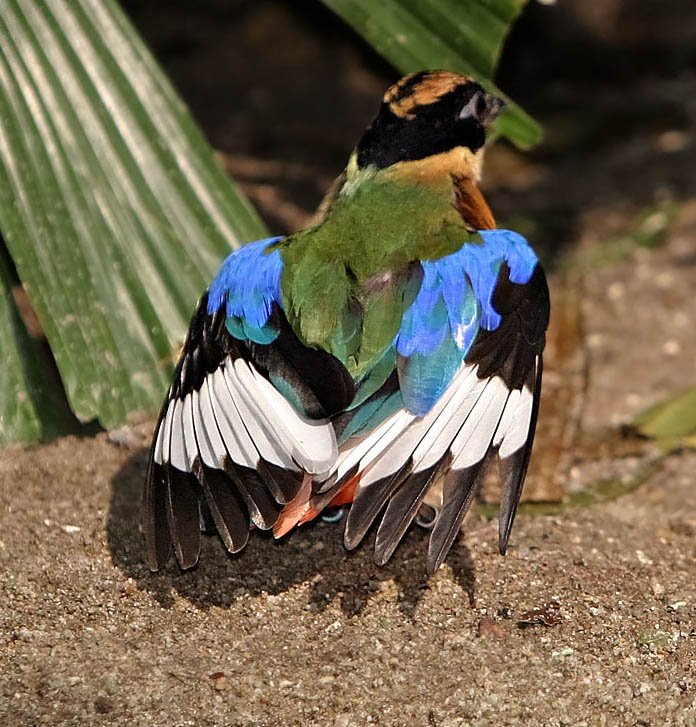
Sunning with spread wings

Measuring 180 to 205 mm (7.1–8.1 in) in length, the blue-winged pitta has a black head with a buff-coloured supercilium, white chin and buff underparts. The shoulders and mantle are greenish, the wings are bright blue, and the vent is reddish. The bill is black, eyes are brown and the legs pale pink. It has a very short tail. Juveniles have similar patterned plumage but are duller. It resembles the mangrove pitta but can be distinguished by its shorter bill. The loud call has been transcribed as taew-laew taew-laew.

== Distribution and habitat ==
The blue-winged pitta is regularly found in Brunei, Cambodia, China, India, Indonesia, Laos, Malaysia, Myanmar, the Philippines, Singapore, Thailand, and Vietnam, and has been found to be vagrant in Australia, Christmas Island, Taiwan and Hong Kong. Habitat is lowland subtropical and tropical forests.

P. moluccensis is found in a variety of habitats, up to an altitude of 800 m (2,600 ft), including broadleaved forests, parks and gardens, and mangroves, though avoids dense rainforest.

The range is much of southeast Asia and Indochina, from central Myanmar east through Thailand and into peninsular Malaysia. P. moluccensis is a winter visitor to Borneo and Sumatra, and a vagrant to the Philippines and Java. It is a rare vagrant to the northwestern coast of Australia.

== Diet ==
The blue-winged pitta mostly feeds on worms and insects, hunting them on the ground or from a low branch or perch. They also eat hard-shelled snails.

== Breeding ==
At breeding time, the blue-winged pitta builds a large nest, usually on the ground, made of twigs, roots, grasses, leaves and mosses. The spherical and untidy nest has a side entrance and is often found between tree roots near water. In its breeding range in peninsular Malaysia, the blue-winged pitta lays eggs between early May and late July each year. The female lays 4-6 white or cream-coloured eggs with purple markings, and both parents take turns incubating the eggs for 15–17 days.
