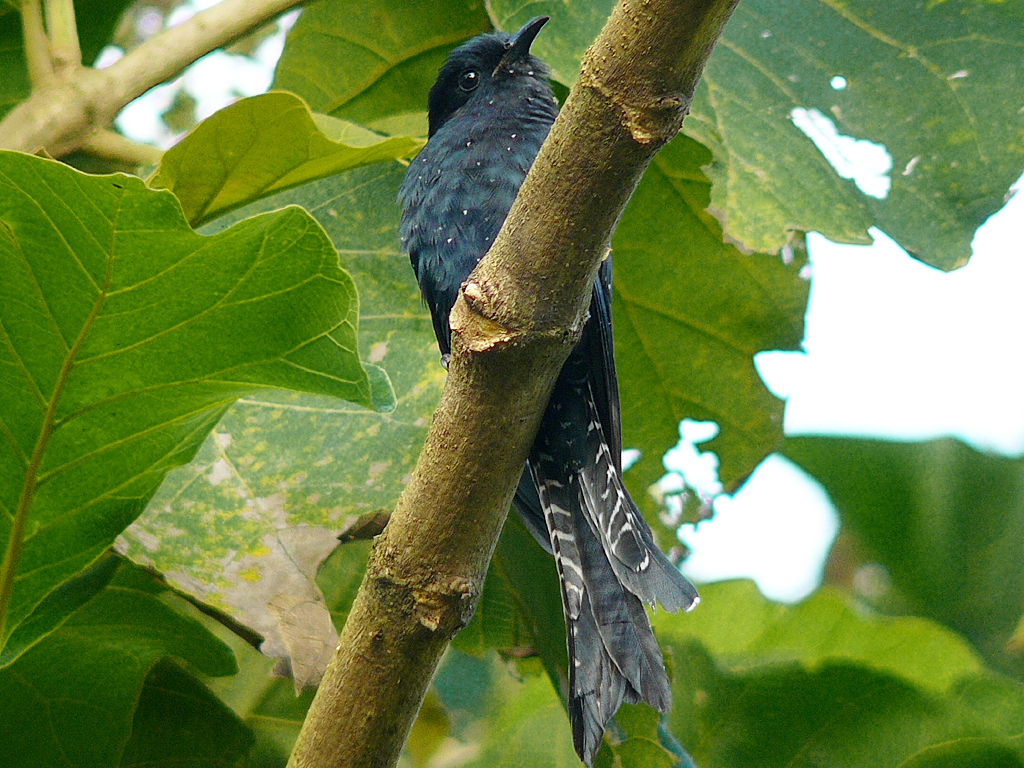
- Juvenile fork-tailed drongo-cuckoo (S. dicruroides)

Scientific classification
- Kingdom: Animalia
- Phylum: Chordata
- Class: Aves
- Order: Cuculiformes
- Family: Cuculidae
- Genus: Surniculus; Lesson, 1830

Type species
- Cuculus lugubris Horsfield, 1821

Species
- S. lugubris S. dicruroides S. velutinus S. musschenbroeki

= Surniculus =

Genus of birds

Surniculus is a small genus of birds in the cuckoo family. Its four members are found in tropical Asia and the Philippines. They are:

Image	Scientific name	Common name	Distribution
	Surniculus lugubris	Square-tailed drongo-cuckoo	Sri Lanka and Southeast Asia and is a summer visitor to the Himalayas from Kashmir to eastern Bangladesh
	Surniculus dicruroides	Fork-tailed drongo-cuckoo	peninsular India in hill forests although some specimens are known from the Himalayan foothills
	Surniculus musschenbroeki	Moluccan drongo-cuckoo	Sulawesi, Buton, Obira, Bacan and Halmahera islands in Indonesia
	Surniculus velutinus	Philippine drongo-cuckoo	Philippines
