= Sumin Reserve Forest =

Sumin Reserved Forest
- Location within Sikkim
- Location: Sikkim, India
- Nearest city: Rangpo, Singtam
- Coordinates: 27°13′23″N 88°31′38″E
- Governing body: Government of India, Government of Sikkim

Sumin Reserve Forest ( also known as Sumen) is located about 20 km from Rangpo town in Pakyong District of the Sikkim state in India.

== Geography ==
Altitudinal Range of Sumin Reserve Forest lies between 800 metres to 1900 metres. At the top of Sumin Forest is Gari Fort. Some natural cave formation can be seen at the higher ridges of this reserve forest.

== History ==
Very little human habitats are there inside this community reserve forest, since histrocal and socio-religious beliefs have conserved and protected this place. For both Hindus and Buddhists this place is considered as a sacred groove. Gadi fort or Budang-Gadi fort is the ruins of the fort built by Chogyal of Sikkim to protect Bhutanese invasion from the east. As per local narrative story - The king of Bhutan attacked kingdom of Sikkim to get back the princess "Pendi" as she flew with the king of Sikkim. The frightened king of Sikkim (or Chogyal) erected a fort to prevent the attack. There is a nearby village, called Pendam; which was named after the princess Pendi. Moreover, there is a Hindu Kali Temple as well at the top. During the time of Rama Navami and for other Hindu festive occasions local pilgrims do offerings to the deity Goddess Kali. Management authority is governed by Directorate of Ecotourism, Govt of Sikkim and Joint Forest Management Committee.

== Natural history ==
=== Biomes ===
- Eastern Himalayan broadleaf forests of the Himalayan subtropical broadleaf forests biome
- Tropical and subtropical coniferous forests of the Himalayan subtropical pine forests biome

=== Fauna ===
Birds at Sumin Reserve Forest include species like the kalij pheasant, hill partridge, satyr tragopan, bar-throated minla, black-eared shrike babbler, white-crested laughingthrush, rusty-fronted barwing, Crimson-browed finch, common green magpie, long-Tailed Sibia etc.

Mammals, that are regularly seen in this park are barking deer, yellow-throated marten, himalayan striped squirrel, hoary-bellied squirrel etc. Beside these, Bhutan giant flying squirrel and particolored flying squirrel is also seen here. From primates, assamese macaque, rhesus macaque and himalayan grey langur are frequently seen.

=== Gallery ===
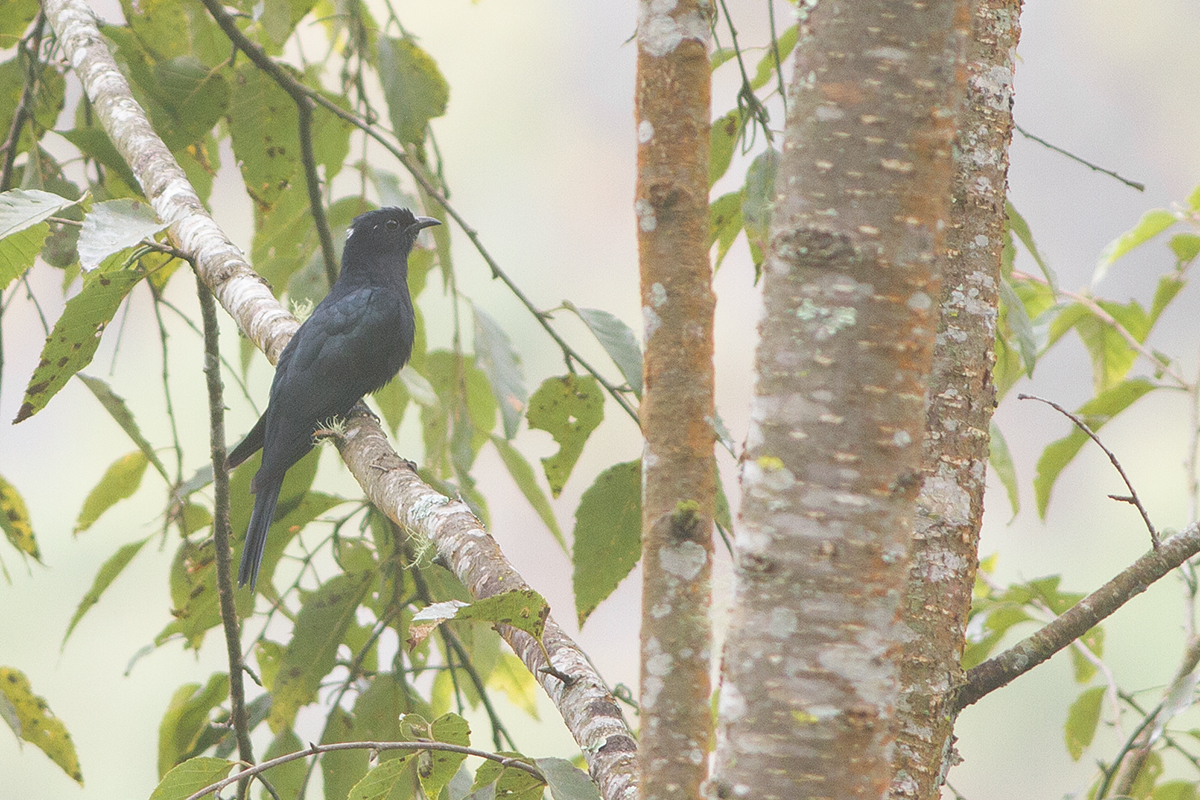
Drongo Cuckoo

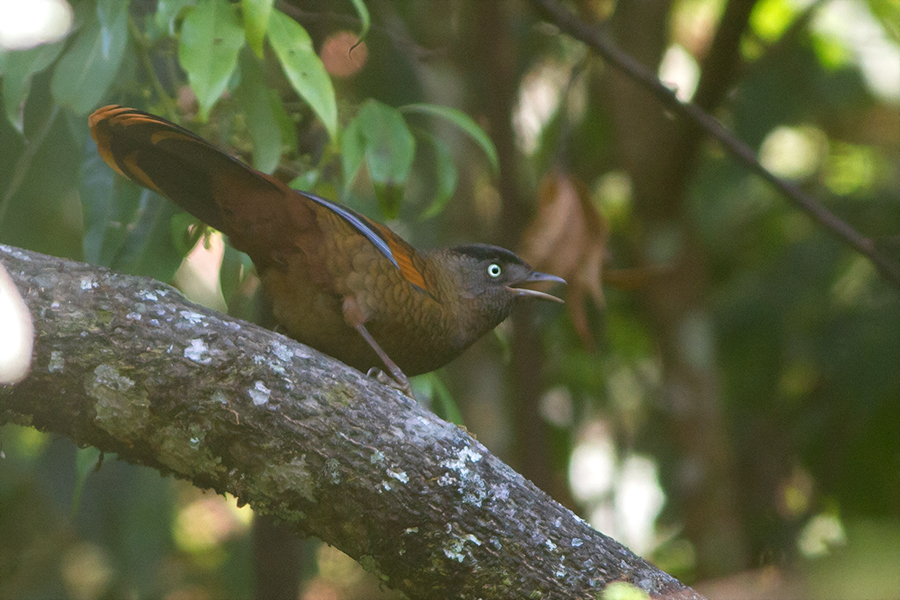
Blue-winged Laughingthrush

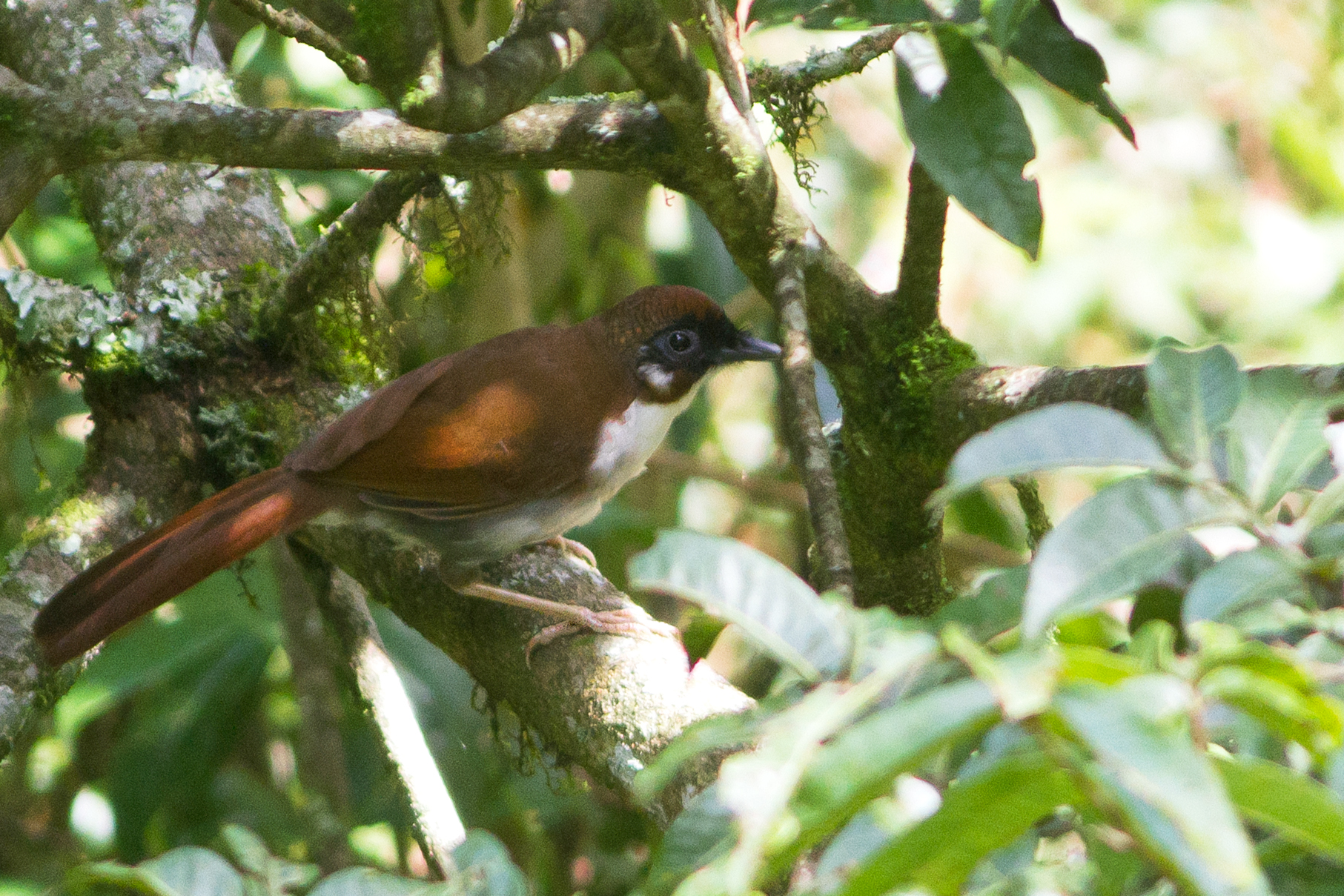
Grey-sided Laughingthrush
