= White-eyed bulbul =

White-eyed bulbul may refer to the following species of birds:

- Cream-vented bulbul, found in south-eastern Asia
- White-spectacled bulbul, found in Turkey and the Middle East
