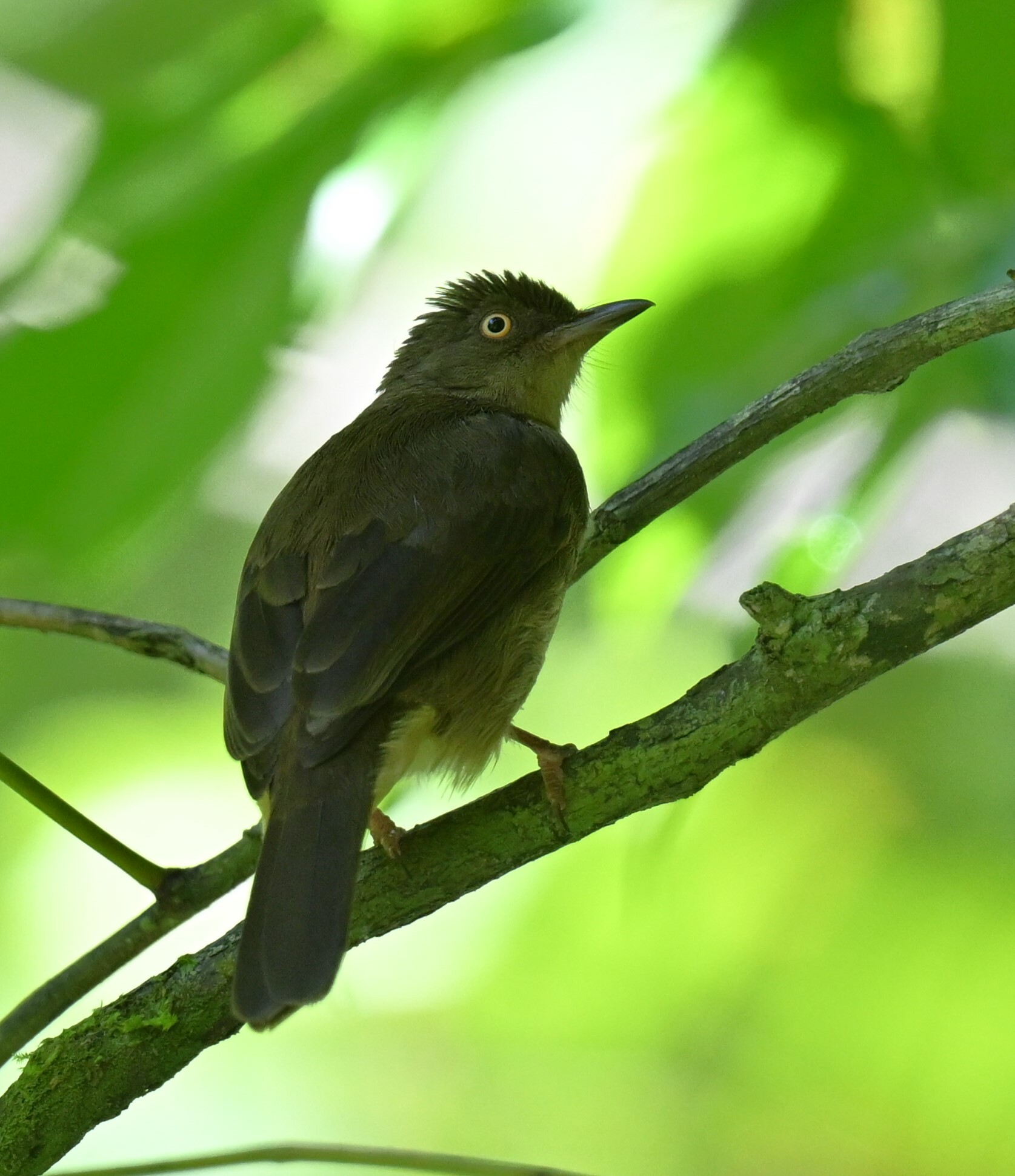

Conservation status
- Least Concern (IUCN 3.1)

Scientific classification
- Kingdom: Animalia
- Phylum: Chordata
- Class: Aves
- Order: Passeriformes
- Family: Pycnonotidae
- Genus: Pycnonotus
- Species: P. pseudosimplex

Binomial name
- Pycnonotus pseudosimplex Shakya et al., 2019

= Cream-eyed bulbul =

Species of bird

The cream-eyed bulbul (Pycnonotus pseudosimplex) is a member of the bulbul family of passerine birds. It is endemic to the island of Borneo.

It was formerly considered a white-eyed color morph of the red-eyed Bornean population of the cream-vented bulbul (P. simplex), especially as actual white-eyed morphs of P. simplex exist outside of Borneo. However, genetic analysis indicates that the Bornean white-eyed population is genetically distinct from P. simplex and most closely related the ashy-fronted bulbul (P. cinereifrons) of Palawan in the Philippines, whereas the Bornean red-eyed population is most closely related to white-eyed P. simplex from mainland Southeast Asia, though it could still warrant recognition as a separate subspecies or even species. Unlike the Bornean cream-vented bulbul, the cream-eyed bulbul is also much more habitat-restricted, occurring mostly in old-growth hill forests.
