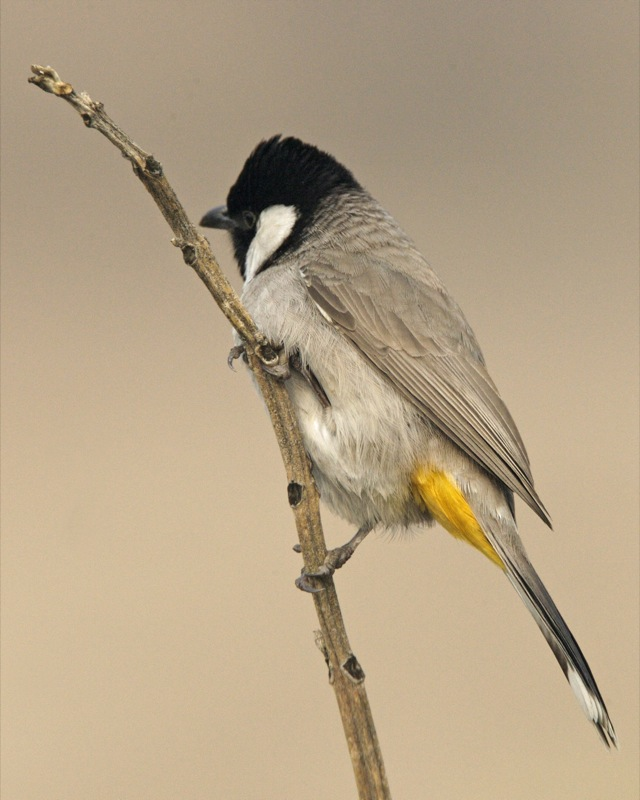
- In Rajasthan, India

Conservation status
- Least Concern (IUCN 3.1)

Scientific classification
- Kingdom: Animalia
- Phylum: Chordata
- Class: Aves
- Order: Passeriformes
- Family: Pycnonotidae
- Genus: Pycnonotus
- Species: P. leucotis

Binomial name
- Pycnonotus leucotis (Gould, 1836)
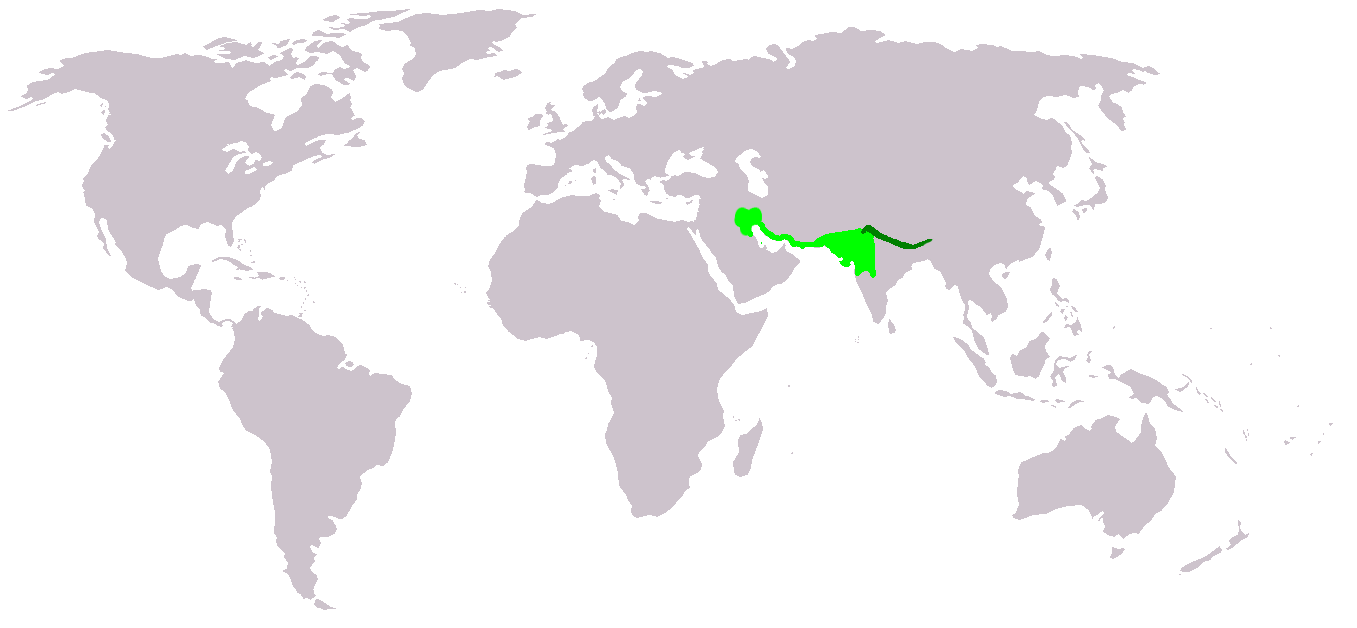
- Native range of P. leucotis (light green) and P. leucogenys (dark green) in the South Asian region

Synonyms
- Ixos leucotis; Pycnonotus leucogenys leucotis

= White-eared bulbul =

Species of bird

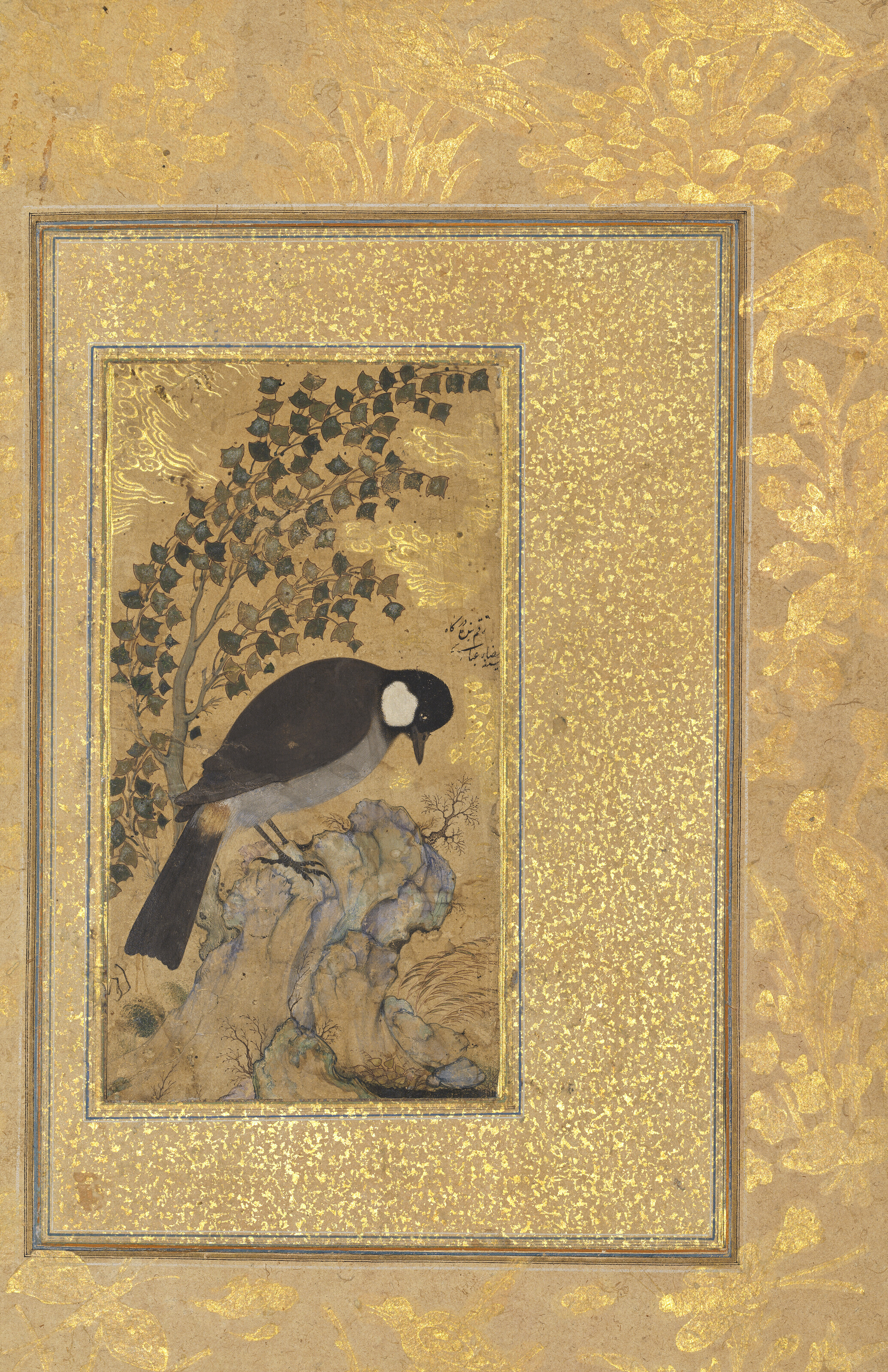
Iranian illustration of the white-eared bulbul (Reza Abbasi, c. 1620, opaque pigments heightened with gold on paper)

The white-eared bulbul (Pycnonotus leucotis) is a member of the bulbul family. It is found in south-western Asia from India to the Arabian peninsula.

== Taxonomy and systematics ==
The white-eared bulbul was originally described in the genus Ixos. The white-eared bulbul is considered to belong to a superspecies along with the Himalayan bulbul, white-spectacled bulbul, African red-eyed bulbul, Cape bulbul, and the common bulbul. Formerly, some authorities considered the white-eared bulbul to be a subspecies of the Himalayan Bulbul.

=== Subspecies ===
Two subspecies are recognized:

- Arabian white-cheeked bulbul (P. l. mesopotamia) - Ticehurst, 1918: Found in north-eastern Arabia, southern Iraq and south-western Iran
- P. l. leucotis - (Gould, 1836): Found in southern Iran, southern Afghanistan, Pakistan and north-western India

== Description and vocalisations ==
The white-eared bulbul is rotund in appearance, and has a brownish-grey body. The tail of this bird is relatively long, tapering outwards. Starting off black, the tail feathers end in white tips. The head of the white-eared bulbul is black, with the area around its cheeks bearing a large white spot. The eye rings of the bulbul are bare, and the beak short. The vent of the bird is bright yellow.

The white-eared bulbul does not have a uniform song but rather a set of notes, which can be used to chirp different melodies. The song is brief, but is described as being "pleasant and fluid."

== Distribution ==
It is native to the western reaches of India, much of Pakistan, southern Afghanistan, coastal Iran, as well as much of the two-river basin in Iraq, Kuwait and the island of Bahrain.

It has been introduced to the remaining Persian Gulf countries including Oman, the United Arab Emirates, and Qatar.

== Ecology ==
Usually the females build the nest, which is constructed in the shape of a messy cup from thin twigs, dry grass, and various plant fibers, and is located in a hidden spot on trees. The clutch contains 2–4 eggs, usually 3, very rarely 5. The eggs are creamy white with purple spots. The incubation, which is made by the female, lasts 13–14 days in Pakistan, or 10.5–12.5 days in Iraq. Both parents participate in feeding the chicks, which fledge after 9–11 days (in Iraq). Of 19 nests in Iraq, only three (about 16%) have raised a new generation; this is likely due to predation by crows, as many nests are only poorly concealed. This is a monogamous species, and males tend to aggressively defend nesting territories from other males

== Conservation ==
The species is listed by the IUCN as "Least Concern" as of 2018 but population sizes are declining.

In Iran, the white-eared bulbul is a popular cage bird, and many households keep it as a pet for its melodious song. Although capturing and keeping wild birds is technically illegal under Iranian law, the practice is widespread, and the Department of Environment generally does not enforce regulations for this species. This widespread captivity raises concerns among conservationists, as it can impact wild populations by encouraging illegal trapping and trade.

== Gallery ==
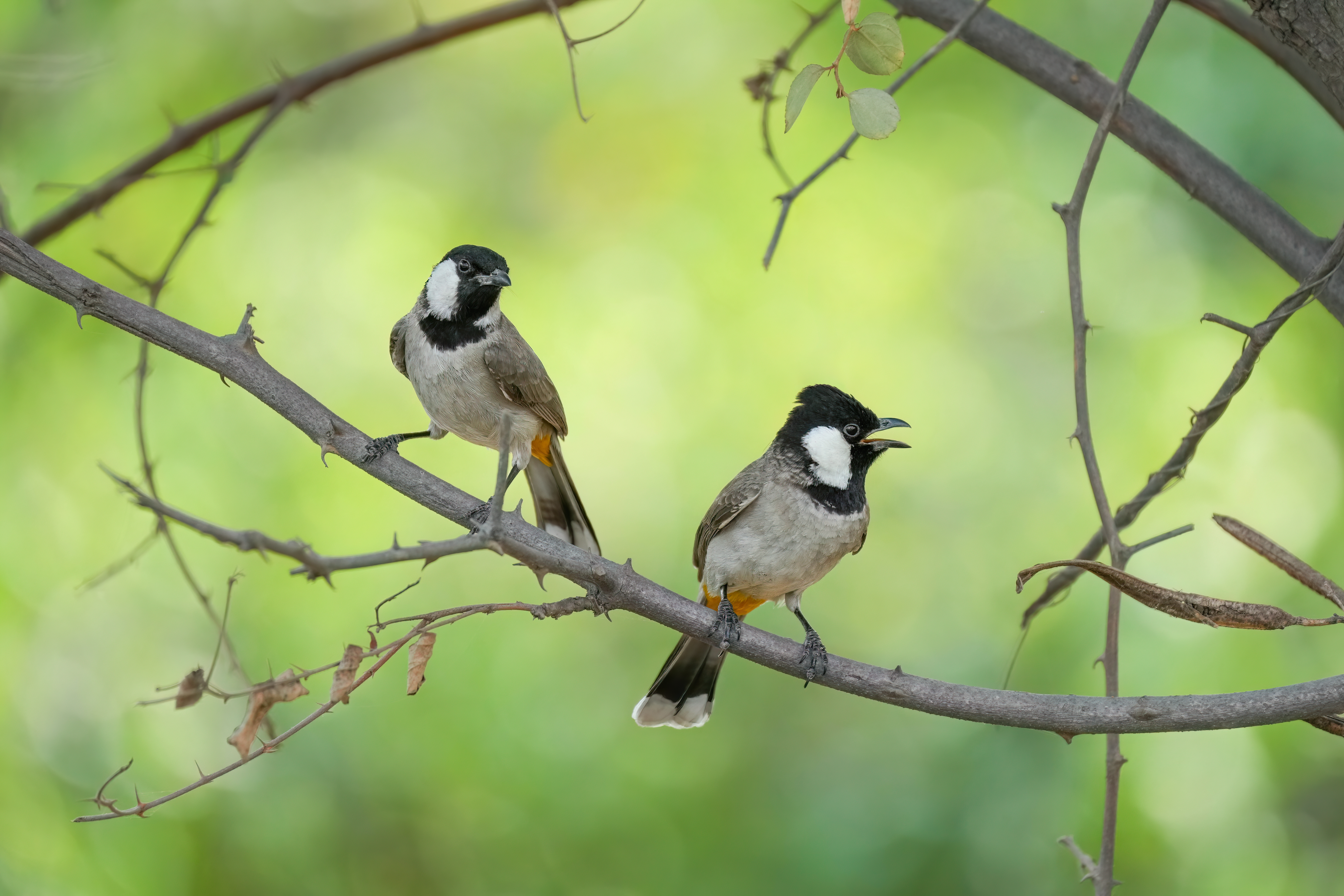
Pair in Keoladeo National Park, India

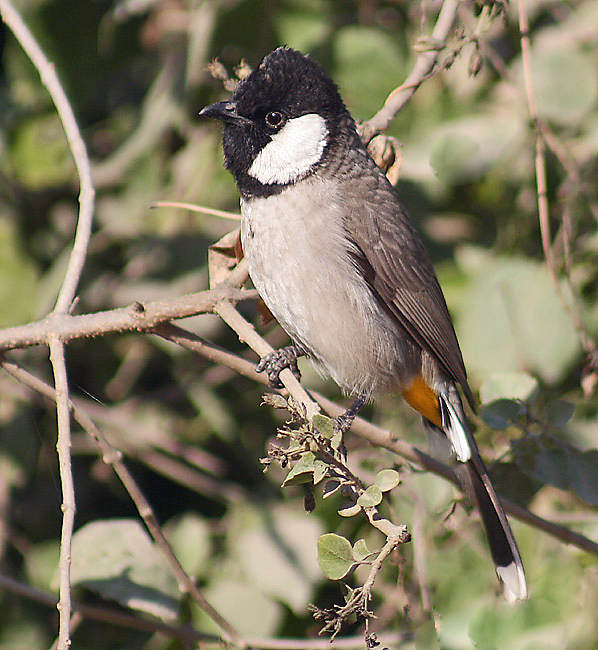
At Bharatpur, Rajasthan, India

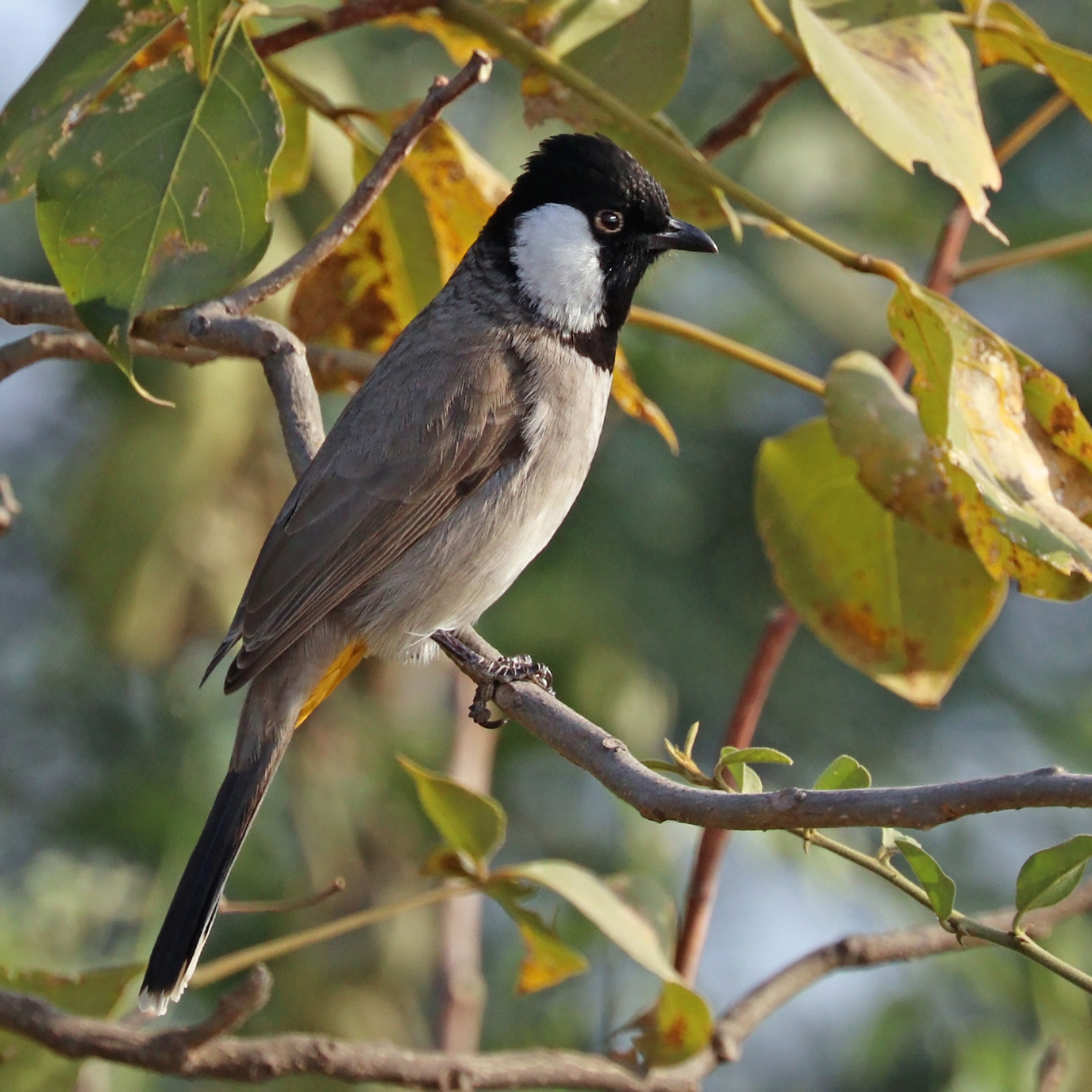
P. l. leucotis, Bharatpur, Rajasthan, India

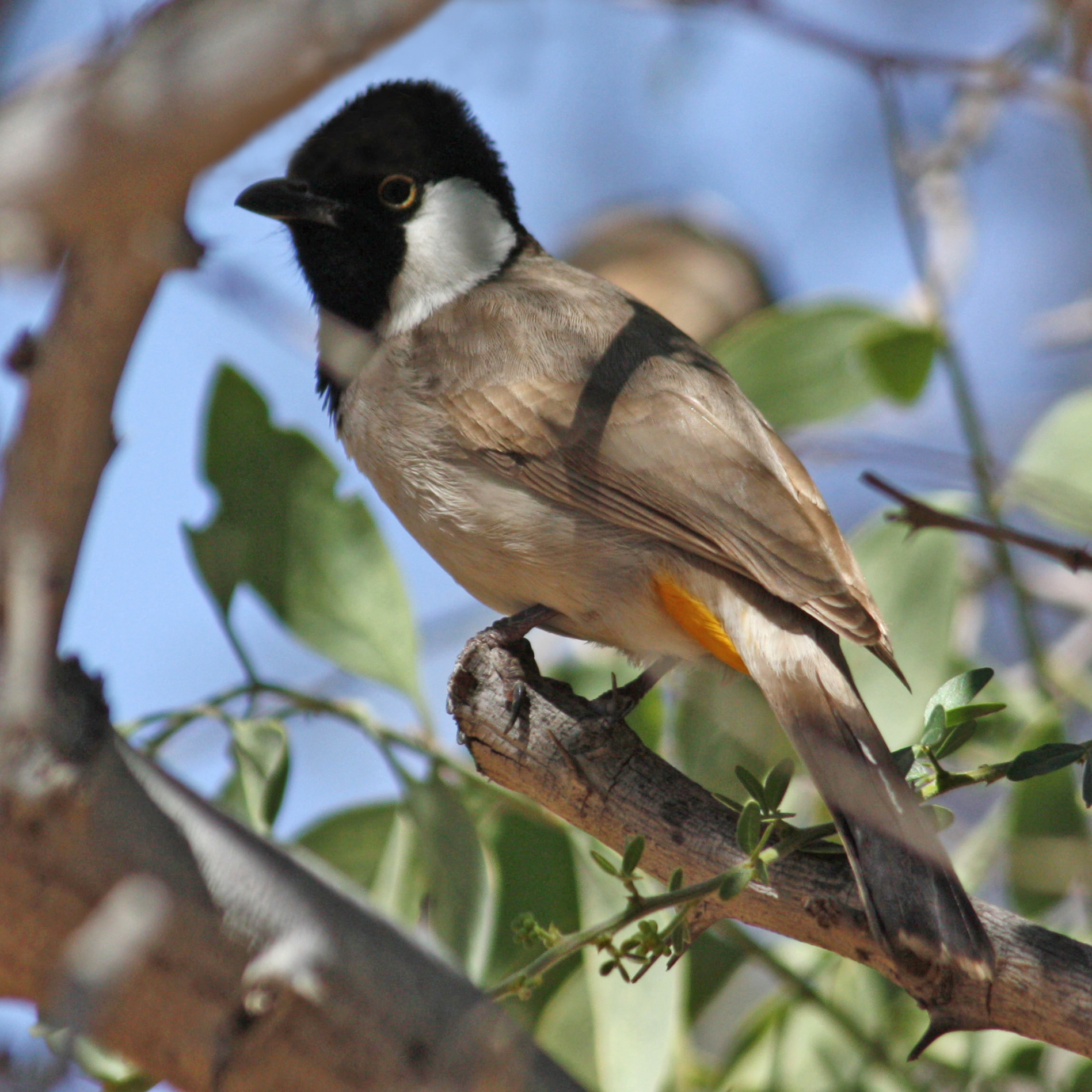
P. l. mesopotamia in Musandam Peninsula, Oman

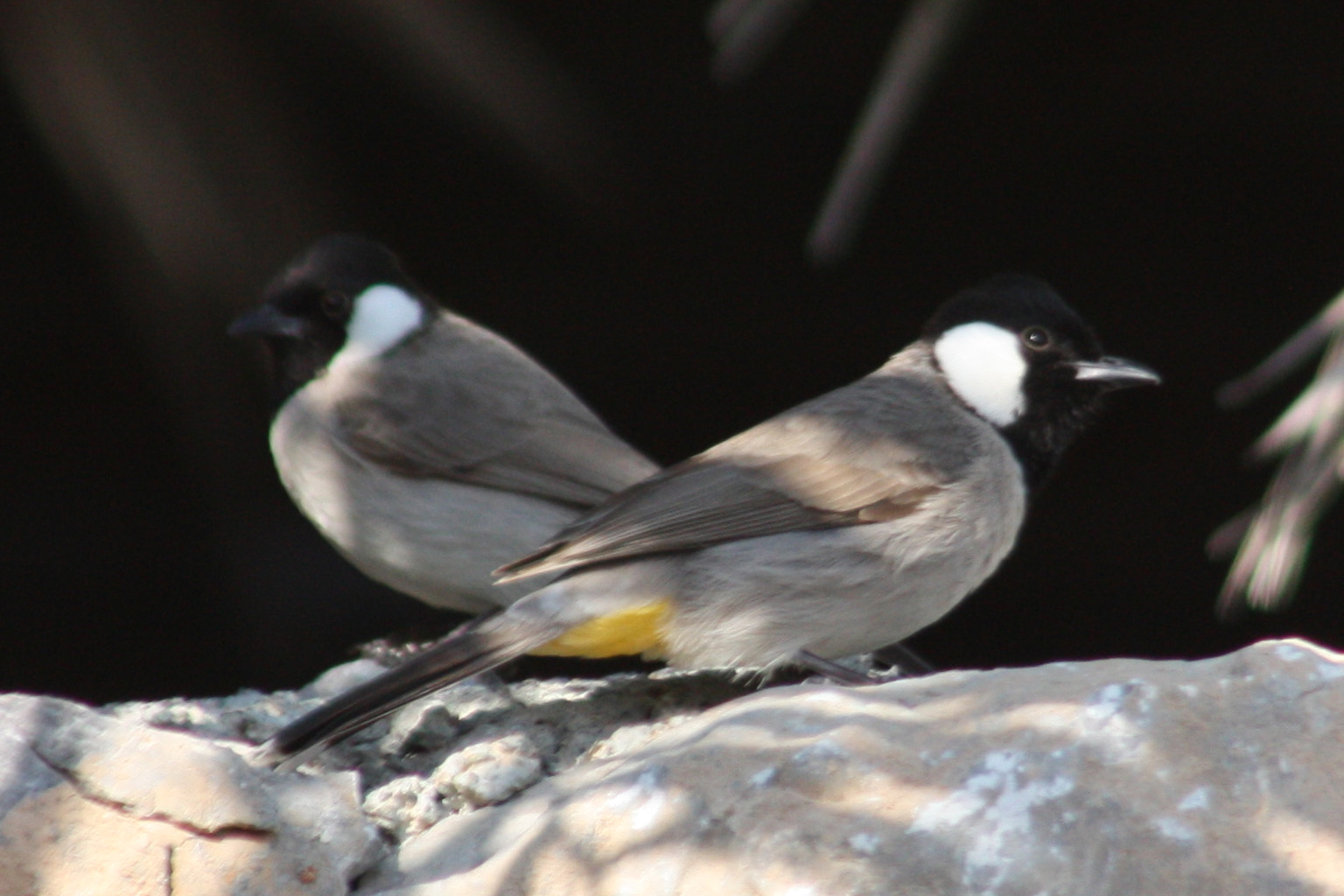
In Babylon, Iraq

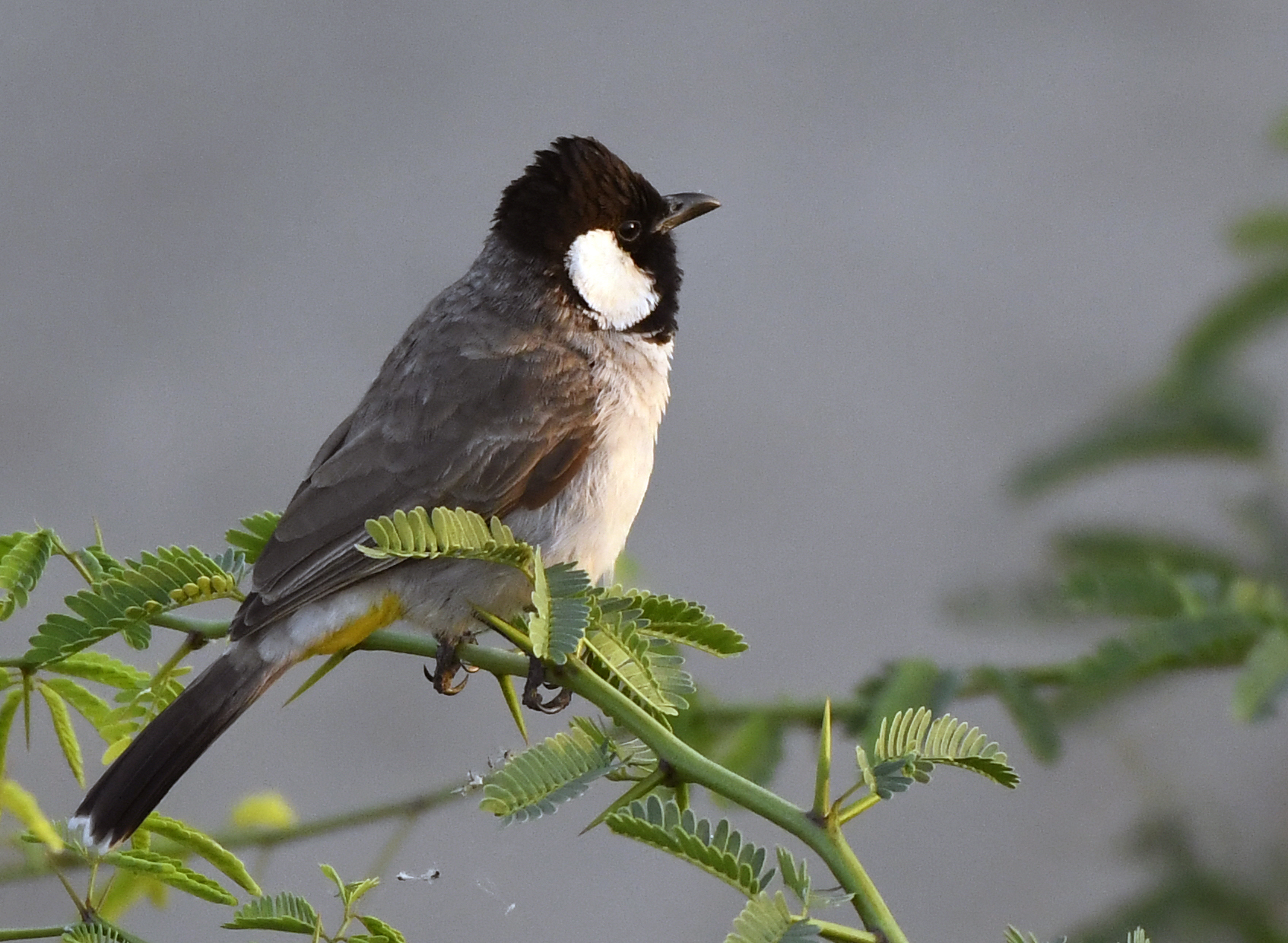
P. l. leucotis at Jamnagar, Gujarat, India

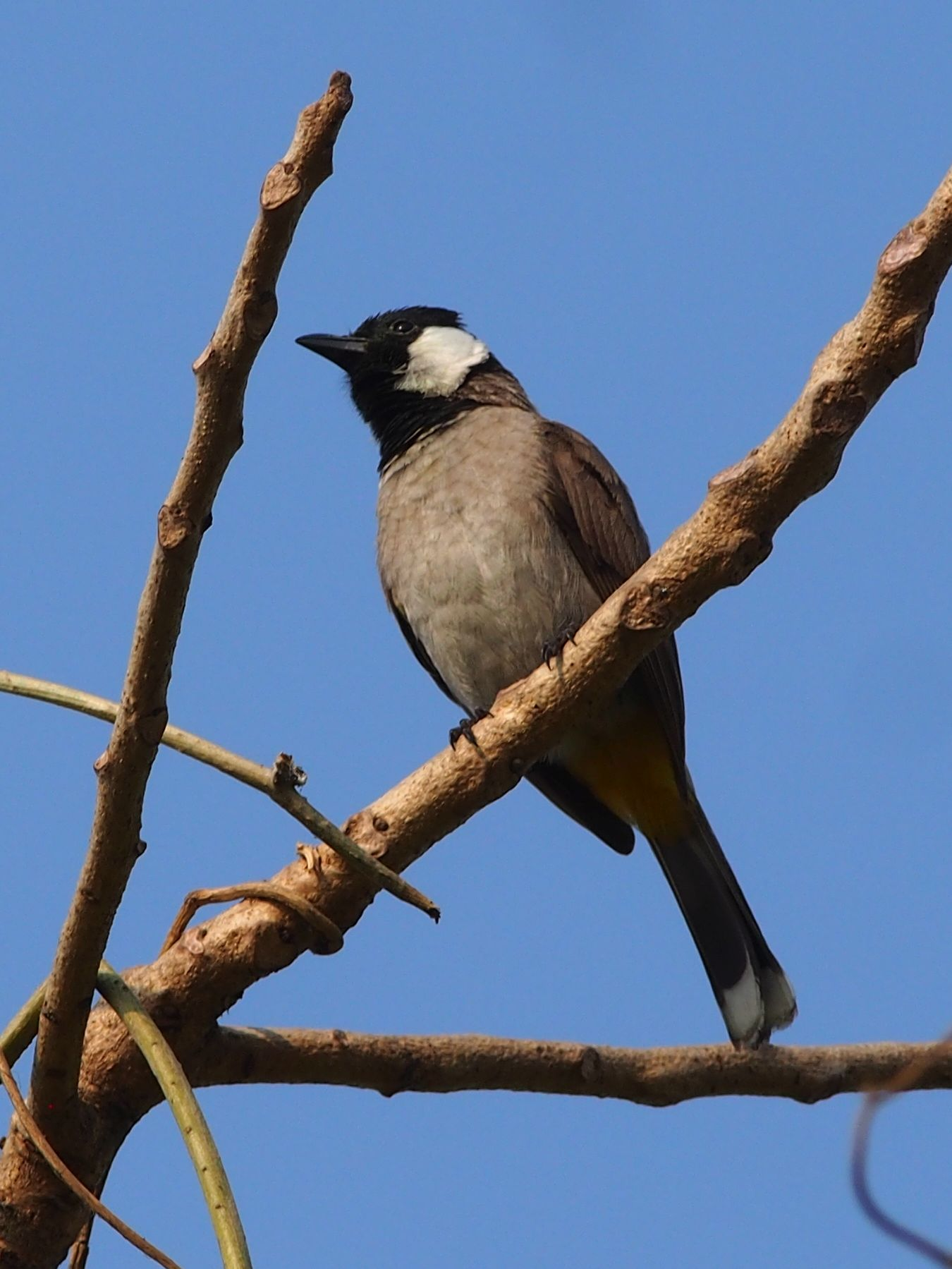
At Seawoods, Navi Mumbai

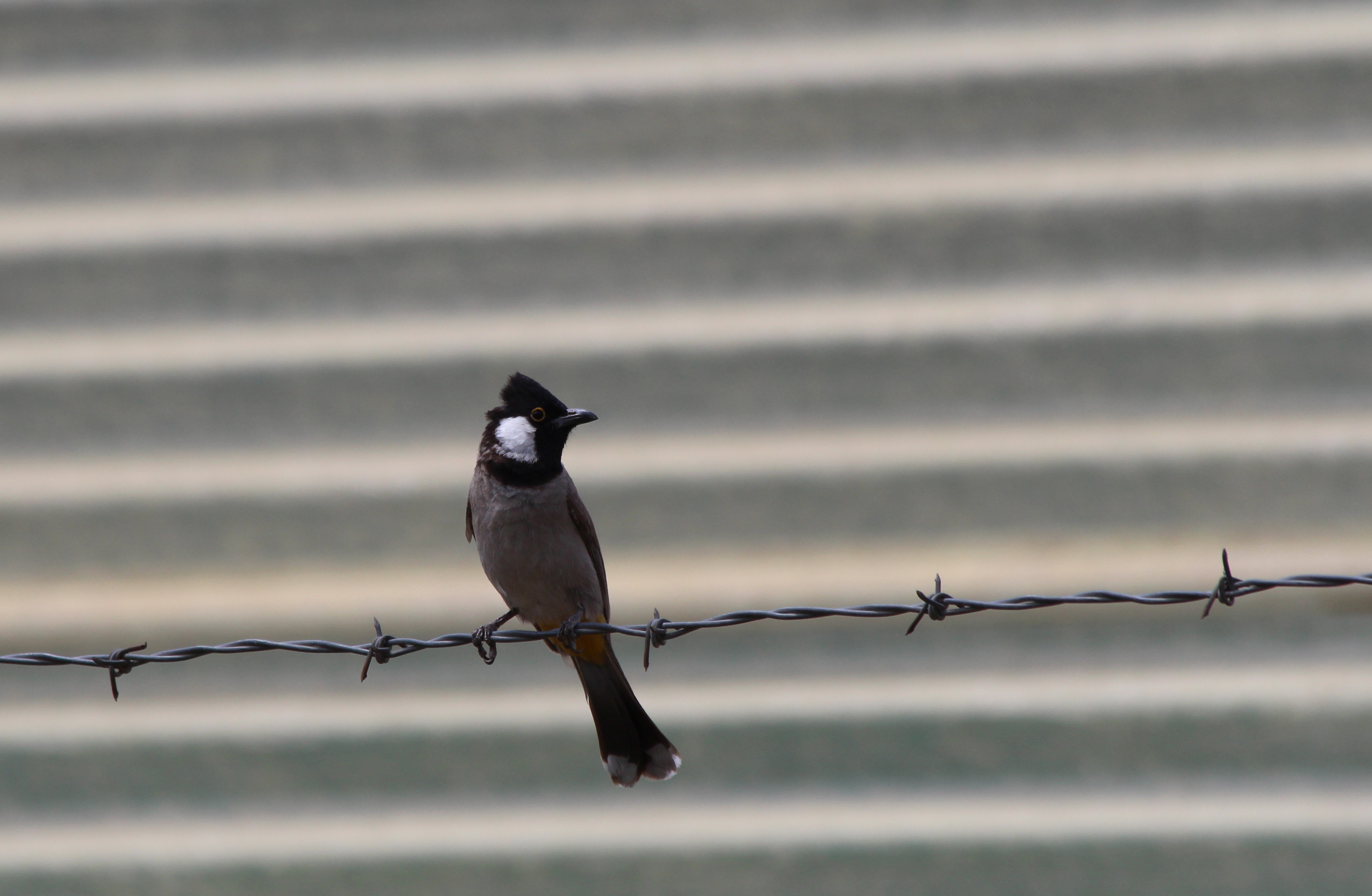
In Baghdad, Iraq

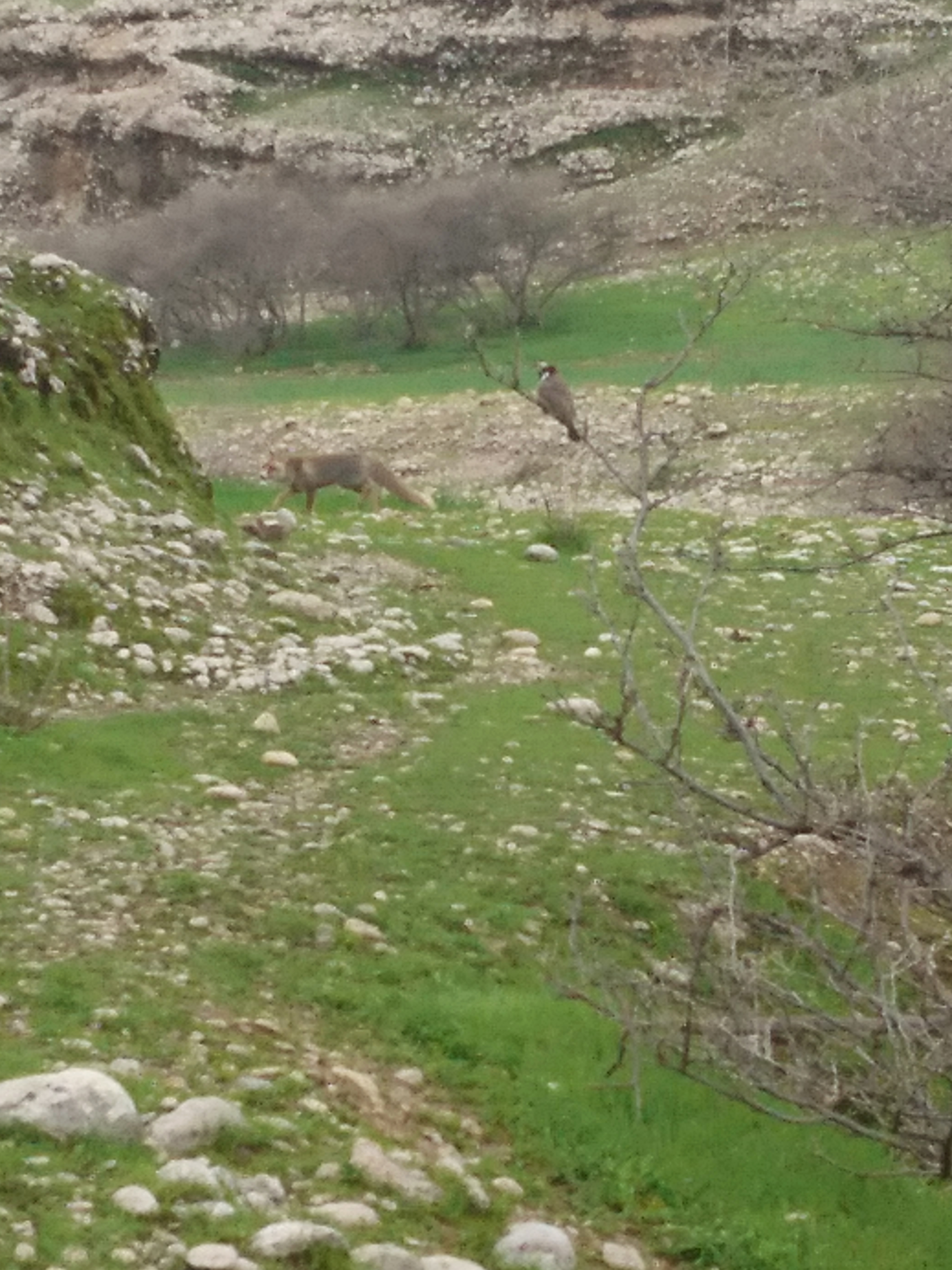
White-eared bulbul watching out for a red fox, Behbahan, Iran

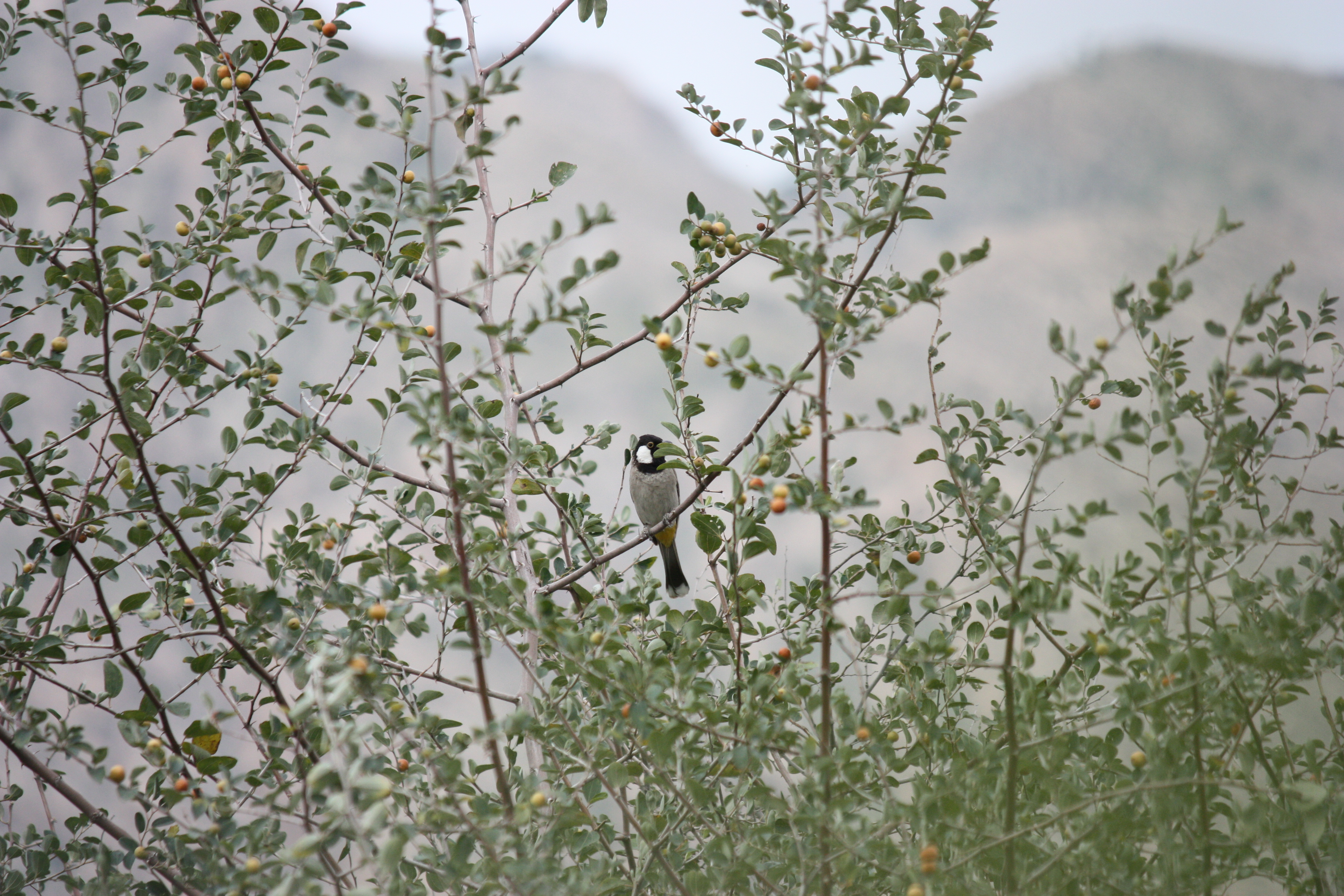
White-eared bulbul on a Ziziphus tree, Behbahan
