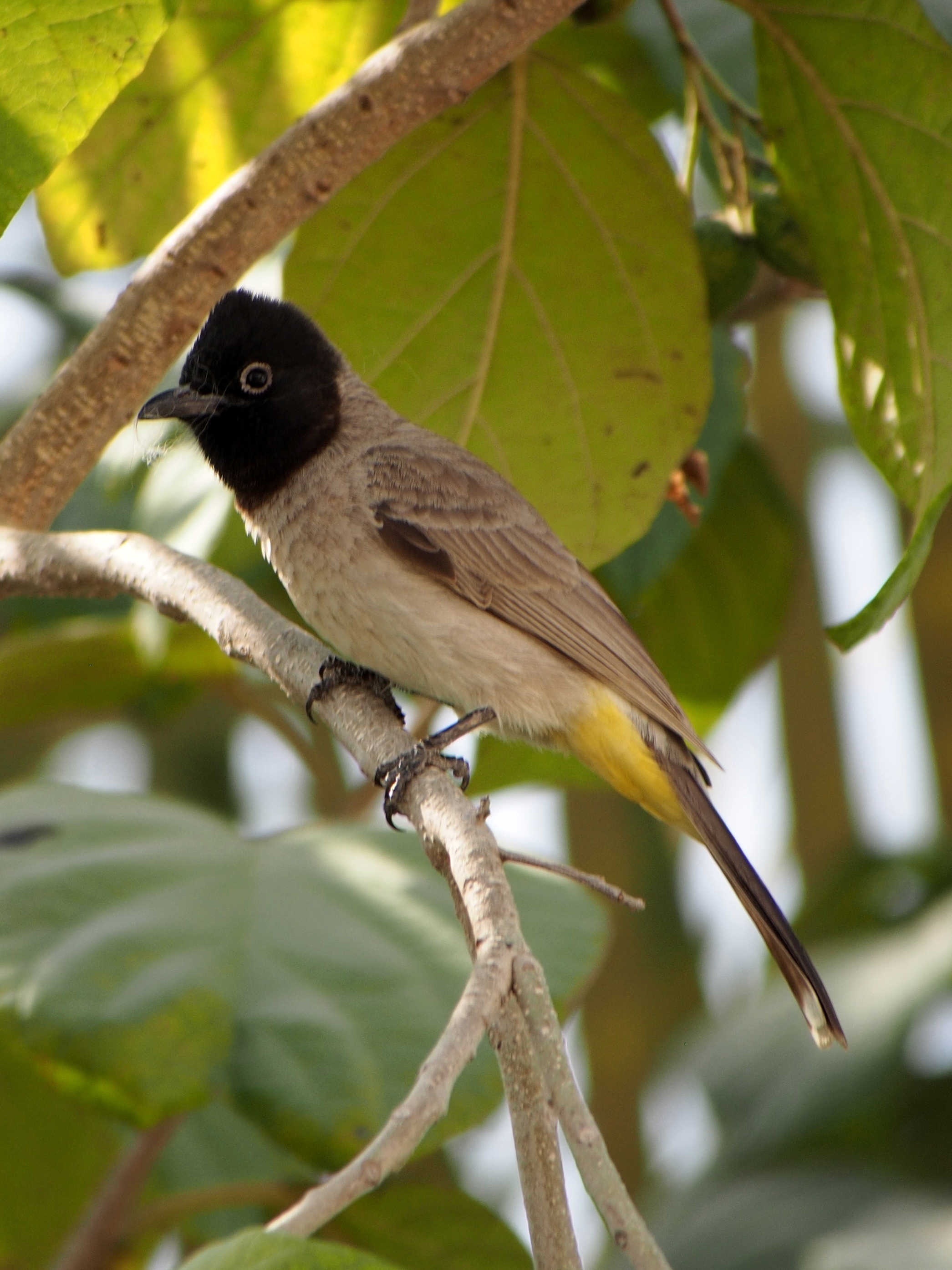

Conservation status
- Least Concern (IUCN 3.1)

Scientific classification
- Kingdom: Animalia
- Phylum: Chordata
- Class: Aves
- Order: Passeriformes
- Family: Pycnonotidae
- Genus: Pycnonotus
- Species: P. xanthopygos

Binomial name
- Pycnonotus xanthopygos (Hemprich & Ehrenberg, 1833)
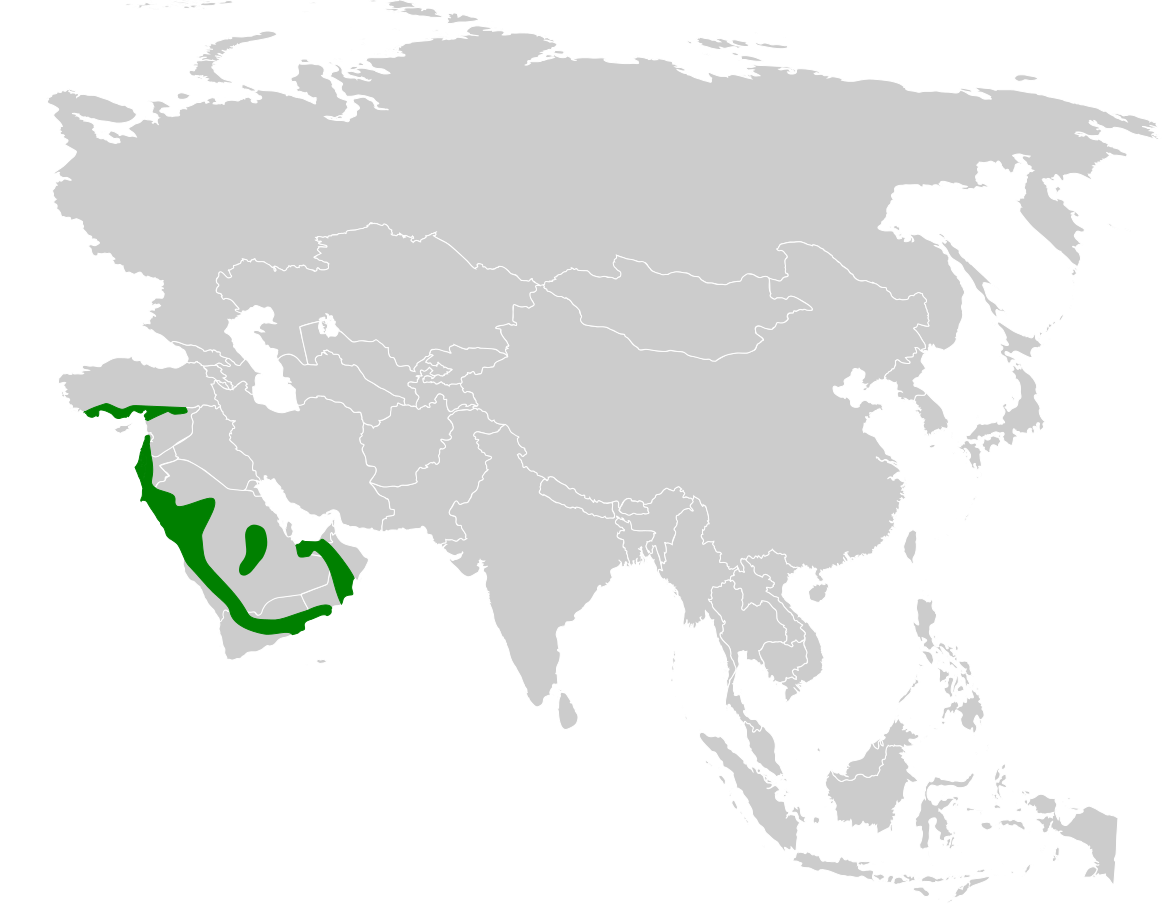

Synonyms
- Ixus xanthopygos

= White-spectacled bulbul =

Species of bird

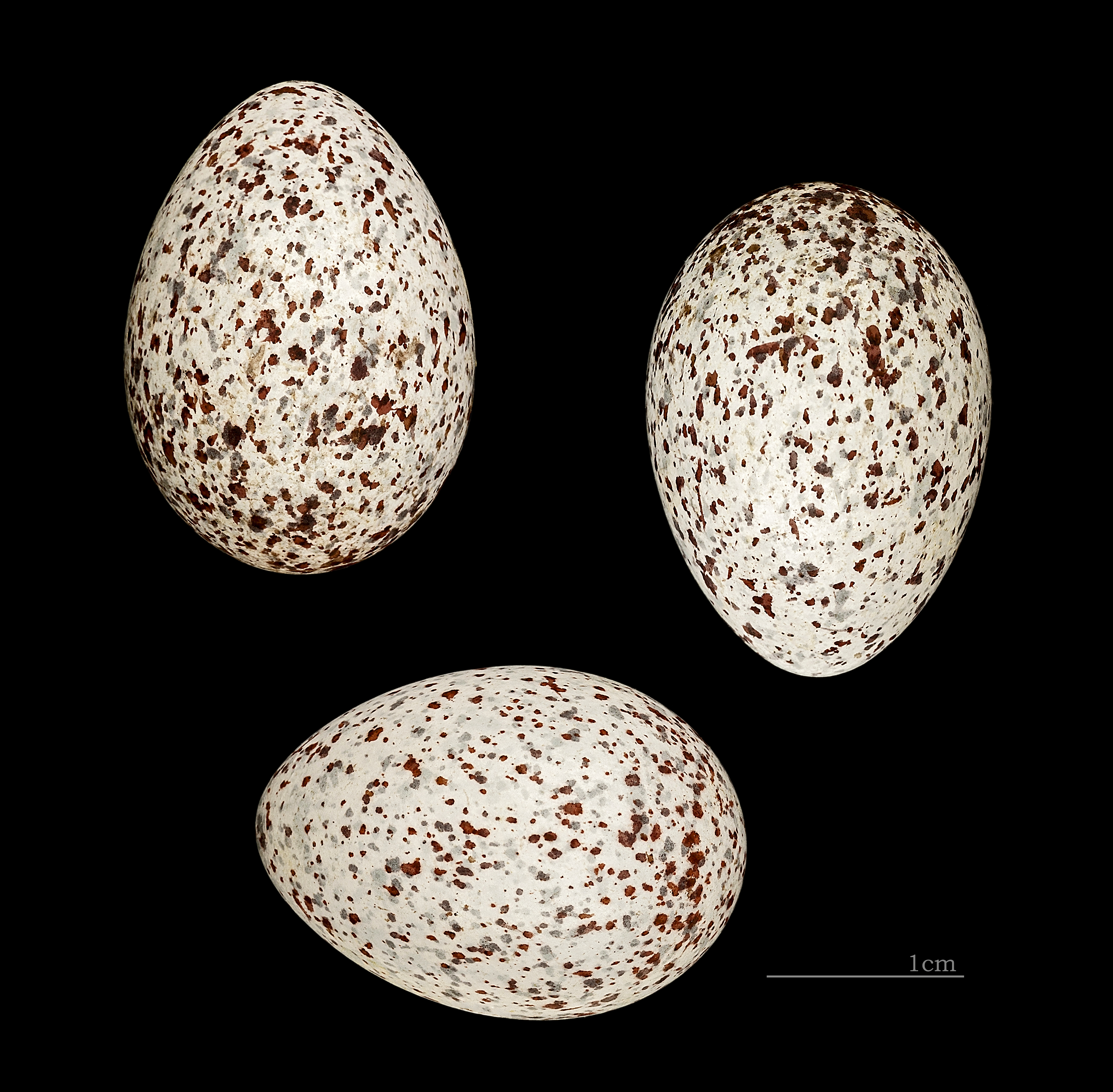
Eggs of Pycnonotus xanthopygos MHNT

The white-spectacled bulbul (Pycnonotus xanthopygos) is a member of the bulbul family. It is 20–25 cm (7.9–9.8 in) in length with a wingspan of 20–25 cm (7.9–9.8 in). These birds live in fruit plantations, gardens, and cities. It is the most common member of the bulbul family in Israel and Lebanon. In Turkey, it is mainly found in the coastal Mediterranean region, but its range extends from Patara/Gelemiş near Kaş in the west to Türkoğlu in the east. Breeding populations are found from Central and Southern Turkey to Western Syria, Lebanon, Western Jordan, Israel, Sinai and western, central and southern Arabia.

Both sexes are similar; juveniles have a browner hood and less obvious eye-rings than the adults. The nest – a small cup of thin twigs, grass stems, leaves and moss – is generally located in bushes and lined with hair, shredded bark and small roots.

== Taxonomy and systematics ==
The white-spectacled bulbul was originally described in the genus Ixos. The white-spectacled bulbul is considered to belong to a superspecies along with the Himalayan bulbul, white-eared bulbul, African red-eyed bulbul, Cape bulbul, and the common bulbul. Alternate names for the white-spectacled bulbul include the several names used for other species (black-capped, dark-capped, spectacled and yellow-vented bulbul) and one name (white-eyed bulbul) shared with the cream-vented bulbul.
