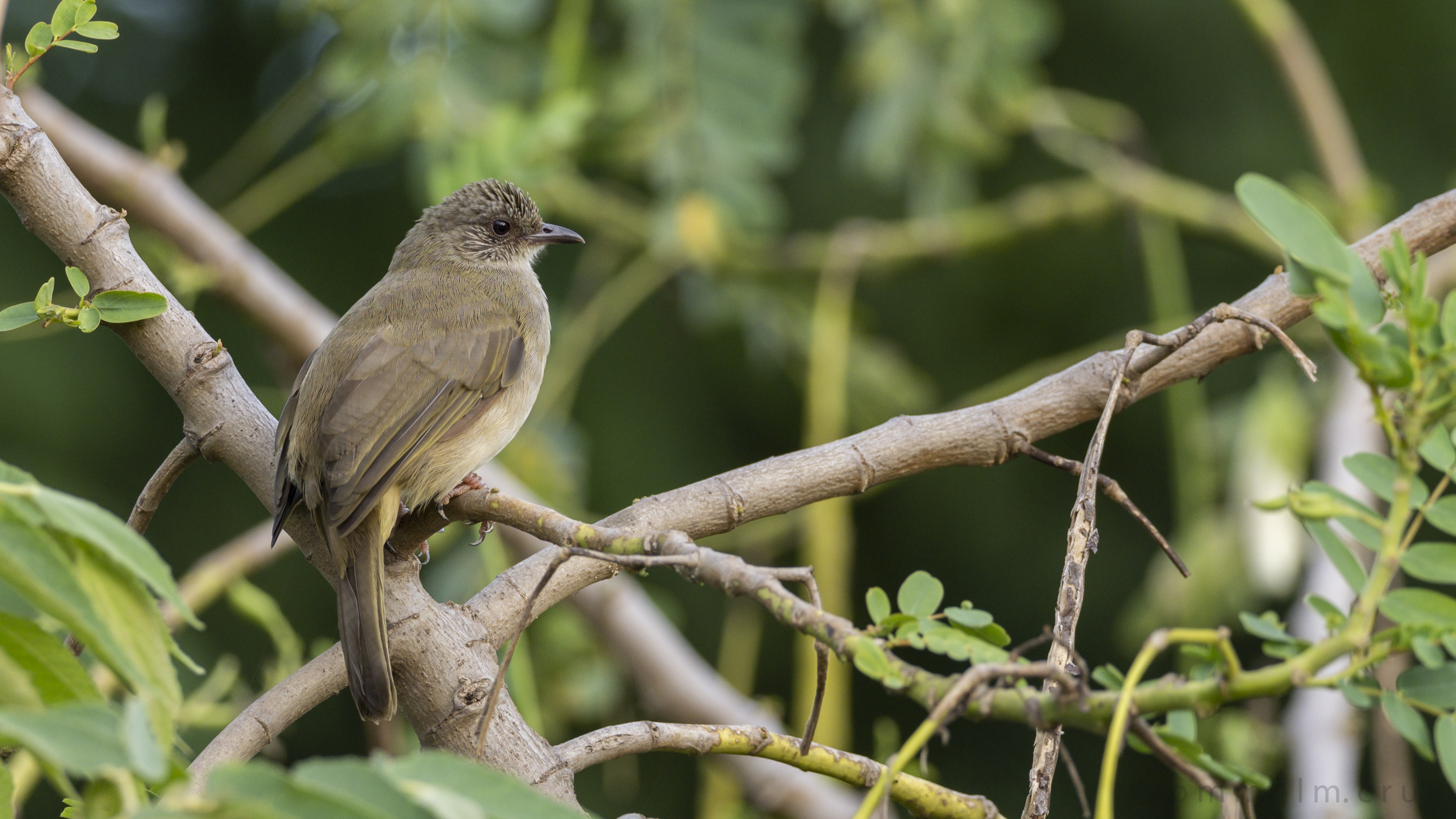

Conservation status
- Least Concern (IUCN 3.1)

Scientific classification
- Kingdom: Animalia
- Phylum: Chordata
- Class: Aves
- Order: Passeriformes
- Family: Pycnonotidae
- Genus: Pycnonotus
- Species: P. cinereifrons

Binomial name
- Pycnonotus cinereifrons (Tweeddale, 1878)

Synonyms
- Brachypus cinereifrons; Pycnonotus plumosus cinereifrons

= Ashy-fronted bulbul =

Species of bird

The ashy-fronted bulbul (Pycnonotus cinereifrons) is a member of the bulbul family of passerine birds. It is endemic to Palawan in the Philippines. Its natural habitat is tropical moist lowland forests. Until 2010, the ashy-fronted bulbul was considered as a subspecies of the olive-winged bulbul.

== Description and taxonomy ==
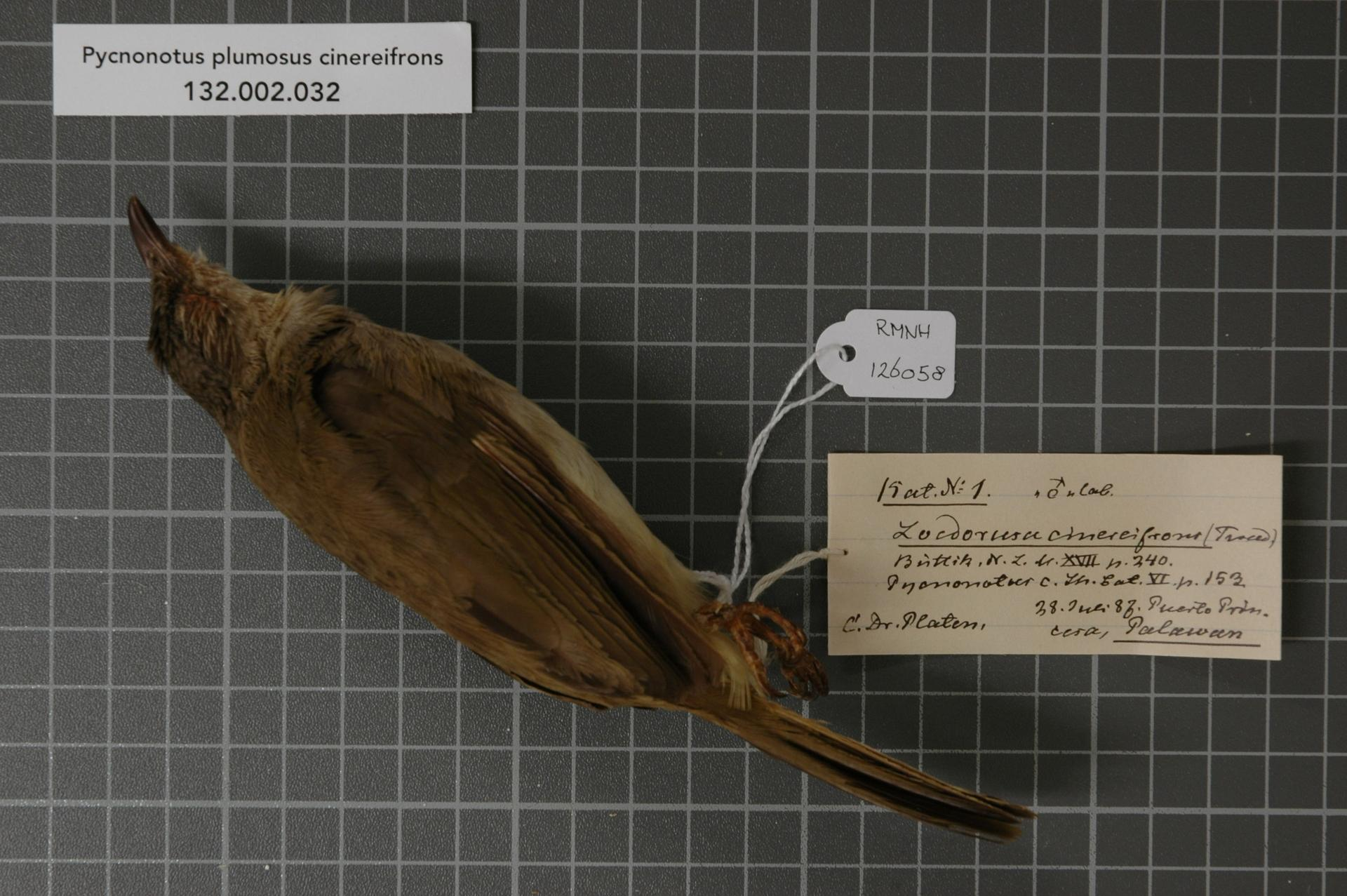
A specimen from the Naturalis Biodiversity Center

It was formerly conspecific with the olive-winged bulbul but differs by its paler bill, gray-flecked forecrown, grayish white and pale belly and olive brown (instead of green) back, wings, tail and rump and different voice.

== Ecology and behavior ==
Not much is known about its diet but it is presumed to be the typical generalist diet of fruits, insects and flowers.

Birds collected in breeding condition with enlarged gonads in April. A single nest photographed in March was cup made with grass, plant fibers with feathers and spider silk containing one single purplish egg.

== Habitat and conservation status ==
Its habitat is primary lowland forest and second growth. It is confined to the lowlands.

It is assessed as least-concern species under the International Union for Conservation of Nature with the population believed to be stable. This species is able to thrive in degraded habitats and is common throughout its range.
