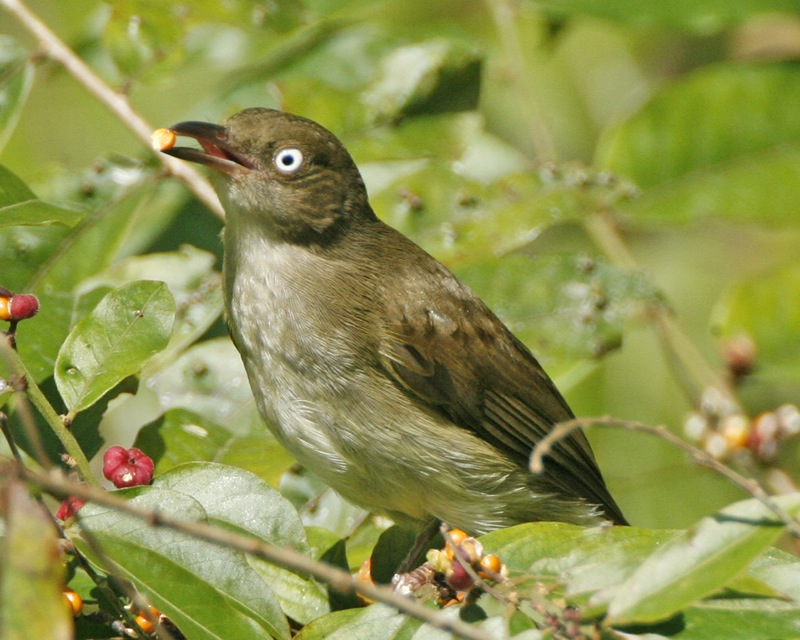
- In Panti Forest, Johor, Malaysia

Conservation status
- Least Concern (IUCN 3.1)

Scientific classification
- Kingdom: Animalia
- Phylum: Chordata
- Class: Aves
- Order: Passeriformes
- Family: Pycnonotidae
- Genus: Pycnonotus
- Species: P. simplex

Binomial name
- Pycnonotus simplex Lesson, 1839
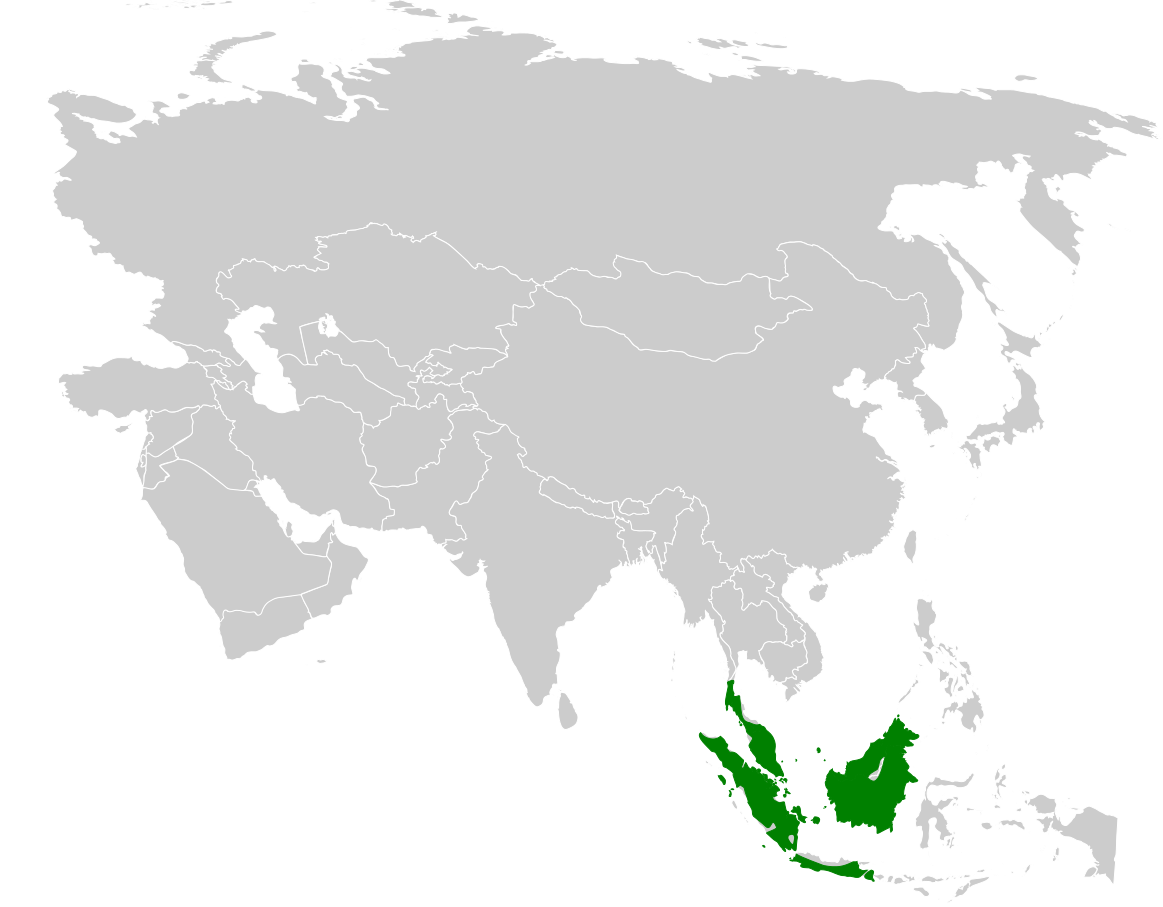

= Cream-vented bulbul =

Species of bird

The cream-vented bulbul (Pycnonotus simplex) is a member of the bulbul family of passerine birds. It is found in south-eastern Asia from the Malay Peninsula to Borneo. Its natural habitat is subtropical or tropical moist lowland forests. Its breast might sometimes look a little yellow.

== Taxonomy and systematics ==
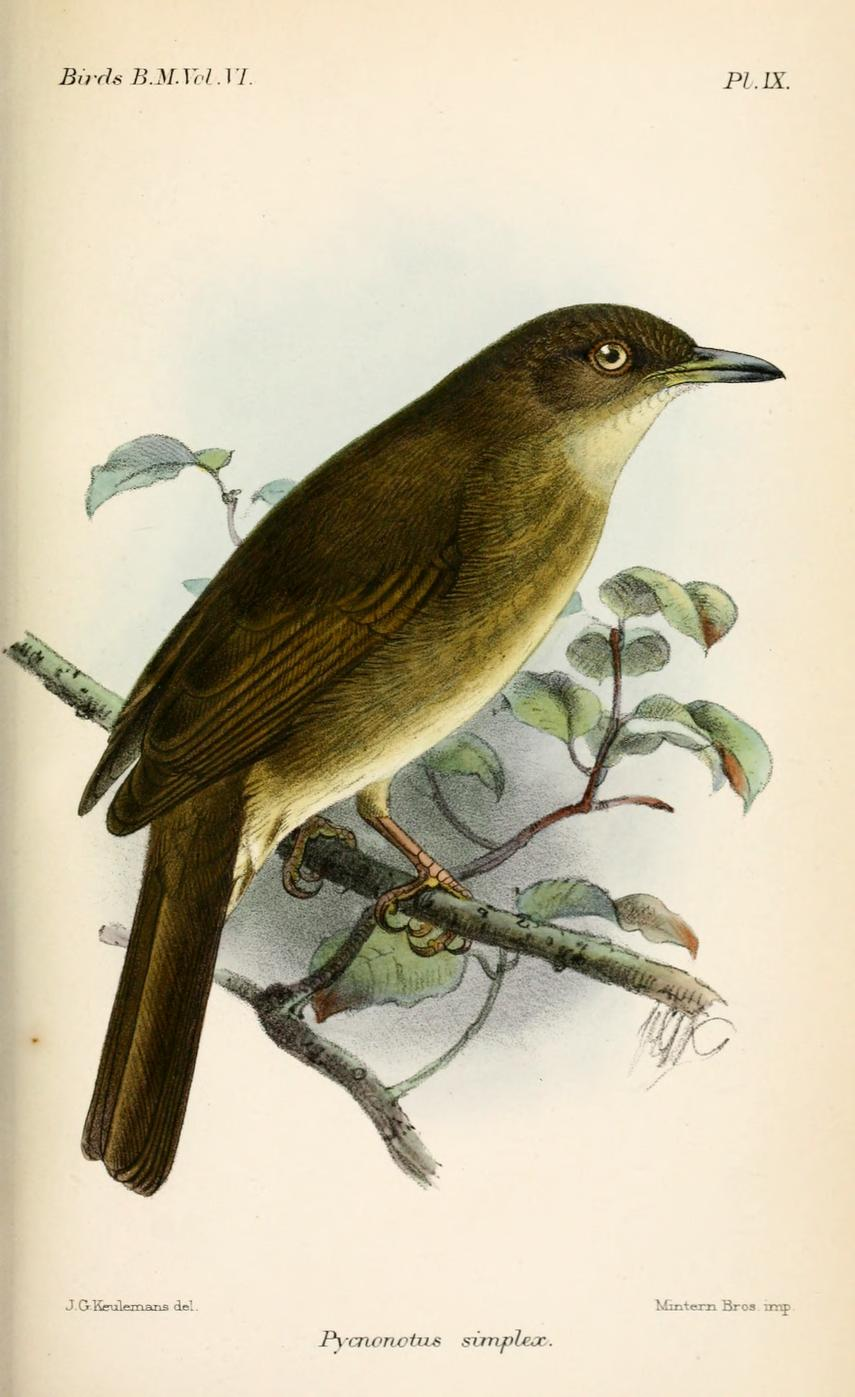
Illustration by Keulemans, 1881

Alternate names for the cream-vented bulbul include the white-eyed brown bulbul and white-eyed bulbul. The latter alternate name is also shared with the white-spectacled bulbul.

=== Subspecies ===
Four subspecies are recognized:

- P. s. simplex - Lesson, 1839: Found from Malay Peninsula to Sumatra and nearby islands.
- P. s. perplexus - Chasen & Kloss, 1929: Found on Borneo and nearby islands. White-eyed populations of bulbuls on Borneo formerly thought to belong to this species are now considered a distinct species, the cream-eyed bulbul (P. pseudosimplex).
- P. s. prillwitzi - Hartert, 1902: Originally described as a separate species. Found on Java
- P. s. halizonus - Oberholser, 1917: Found on Anambas and northern Natuna Islands
