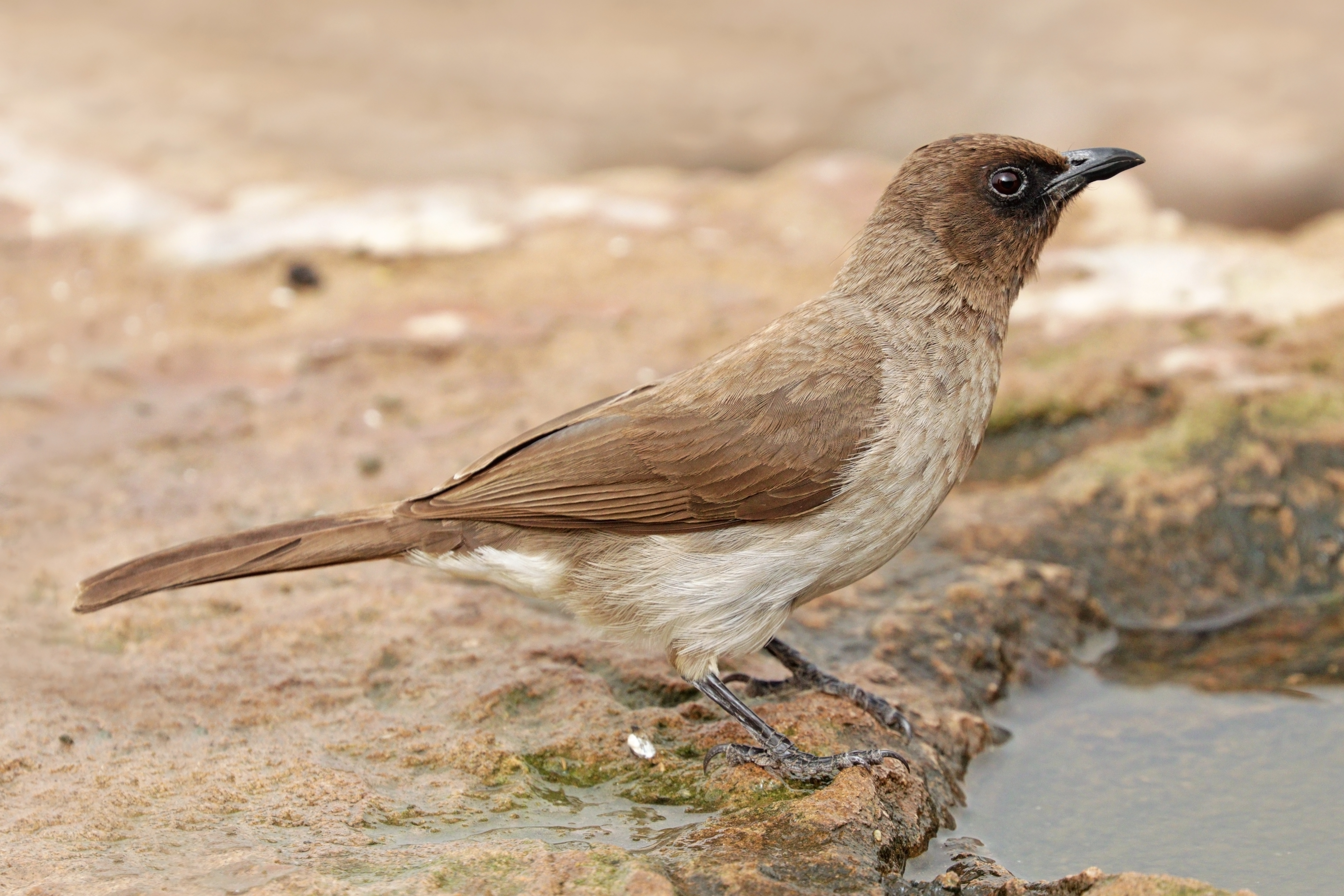
- Nominate P. b. barbatus, Souss-Massa National Park, Morocco

Conservation status
- Least Concern (IUCN 3.1)

Scientific classification
- Kingdom: Animalia
- Phylum: Chordata
- Class: Aves
- Order: Passeriformes
- Family: Pycnonotidae
- Genus: Pycnonotus
- Species: P. barbatus

Binomial name
- Pycnonotus barbatus (Desfontaines, 1789)

Synonyms
- Turdus barbatus

= Common bulbul =

Species of bird

The common bulbul (Pycnonotus barbatus) is a member of the bulbul family of passerine birds. It is widespread throughout most of Africa except for the very arid areas, and has recently begun breeding in southernmost Spain. Ten subspecies are recognised based on the geographical variation in plumage. Some of these were formerly considered as separate species: Dodson's bulbul, the Somali bulbul and the dark-capped bulbul.

== Taxonomy and systematics ==
The common bulbul was formally described and illustrated in 1789 by the French botanist René Desfontaines from a specimen collected near Algiers in Algeria. He placed it with the thrushes in the genus Turdus and coined the binomial name Turdus barbatus. The common bulbul is now one of 31 species placed in the genus Pycnonotus that was introduced in 1826 by the German zoologist Friedrich Boie. The genus name combines the Ancient Greek πυκνος/puknos meaning "thick" or "compact" with -νωτος/-nōtos meaning "-backed". The specific epithet barbatus is Latin meaning bearded. Alternate names for the common bulbul include black-eyed bulbul, black-capped bulbul and common garden bulbul.

Ten subspecies are recognised. Several of these have sometimes been treated as separate species based on the differences in plumage but the differences are clinal and there are no significant vocal differences.

- Pycnonotus barbatus barbatus (Desfontaines, 1789) – southern Spain, Morocco to Tunisia
- Pycnonotus barbatus inornatus (Fraser, 1843) – south Mauritania and Senegal to west Chad and north Cameroon
- Pycnonotus barbatus gabonensis Sharpe, 1871 – central Nigeria and central Cameroon to Gabon and south Congo
- Pycnonotus barbatus arsinoe (Lichtenstein, MHC, 1823) – east Chad, north, central Sudan and east Egypt
- Pycnonotus barbatus schoanus Neumann, 1905 – southeast Sudan, west, central, east Ethiopia, Eritrea
- Pycnonotus barbatus dodsoni Sharpe, 1895 – north Somalia and southeast Ethiopia to central east Kenya (Dodson's bulbul)
- Pycnonotus barbatus somaliensis Reichenow, 1905 – Djibouti, northwest Somalia and northeast Ethiopia (Somali bulbul)
- Pycnonotus barbatus spurius Reichenow, 1905 – south Ethiopia (Dark-capped bulbul group)
- Pycnonotus barbatus layardi Gurney, JH Sr, 1879 – southeast Kenya to east, south Zambia, northeast Botswana and South Africa (Dark-capped bulbul group)
- Pycnonotus barbatus tricolor (Hartlaub, 1862) – east Cameroon to DR Congo, south Sudan, west, central Kenya, Angola, northwest Botswana and north, west Zambia (Dark-capped bulbul group)
P. b. arsinoe, Egypt

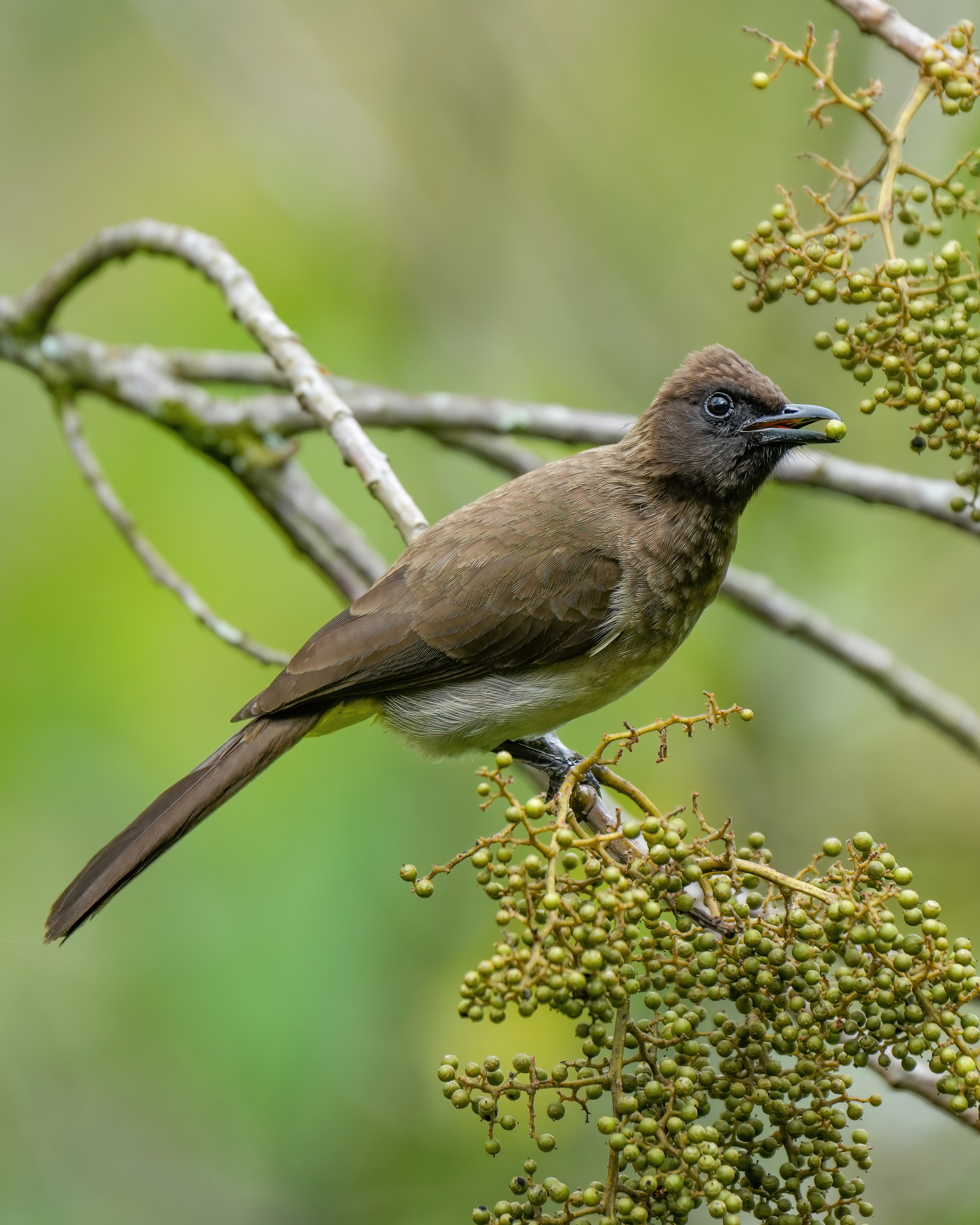
P. b. tricolor, Bwindi Impenetrable National Park, Uganda

P. b. layardi, Eswatini

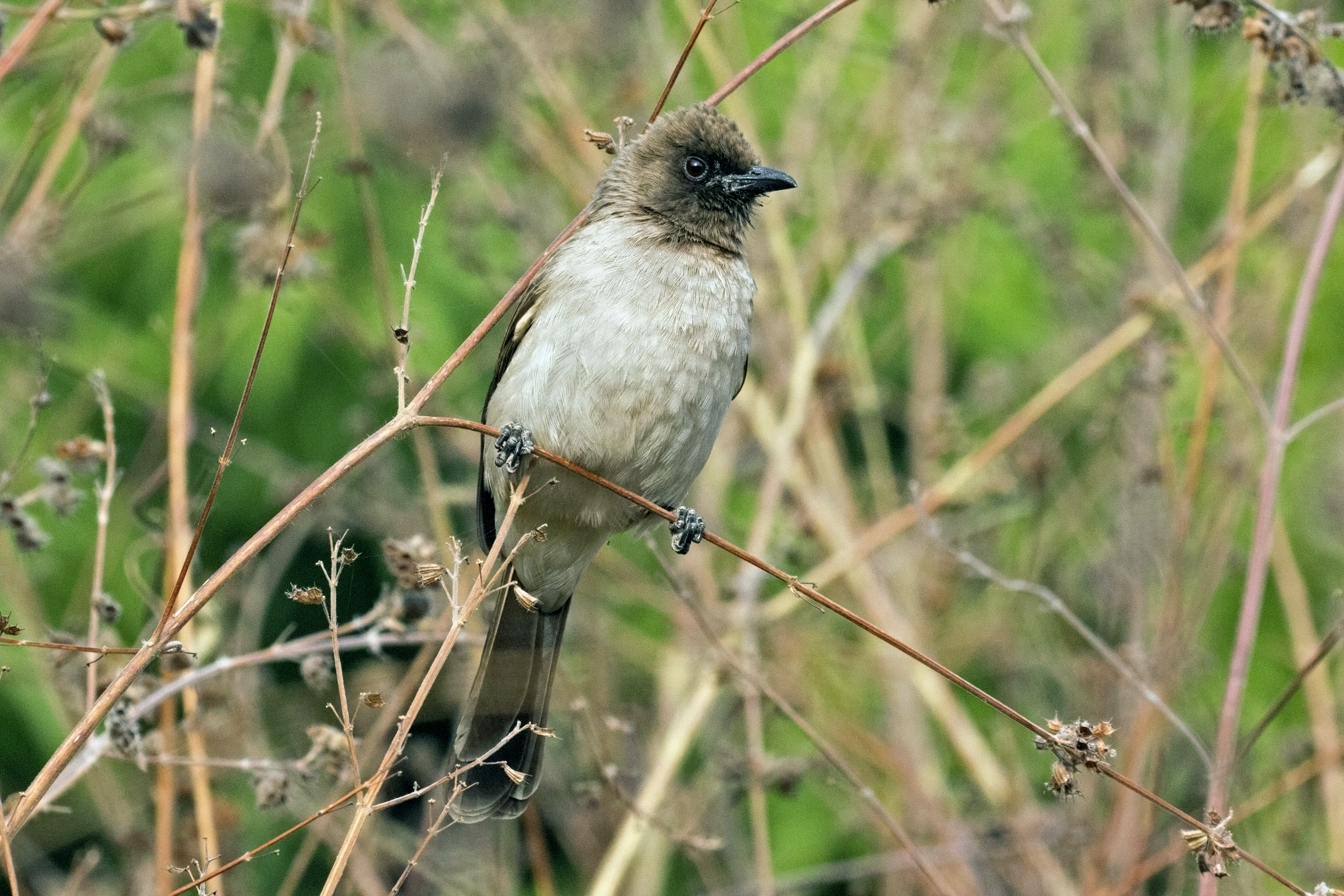
P. b. inornatus, Bukau Forest, Gambia

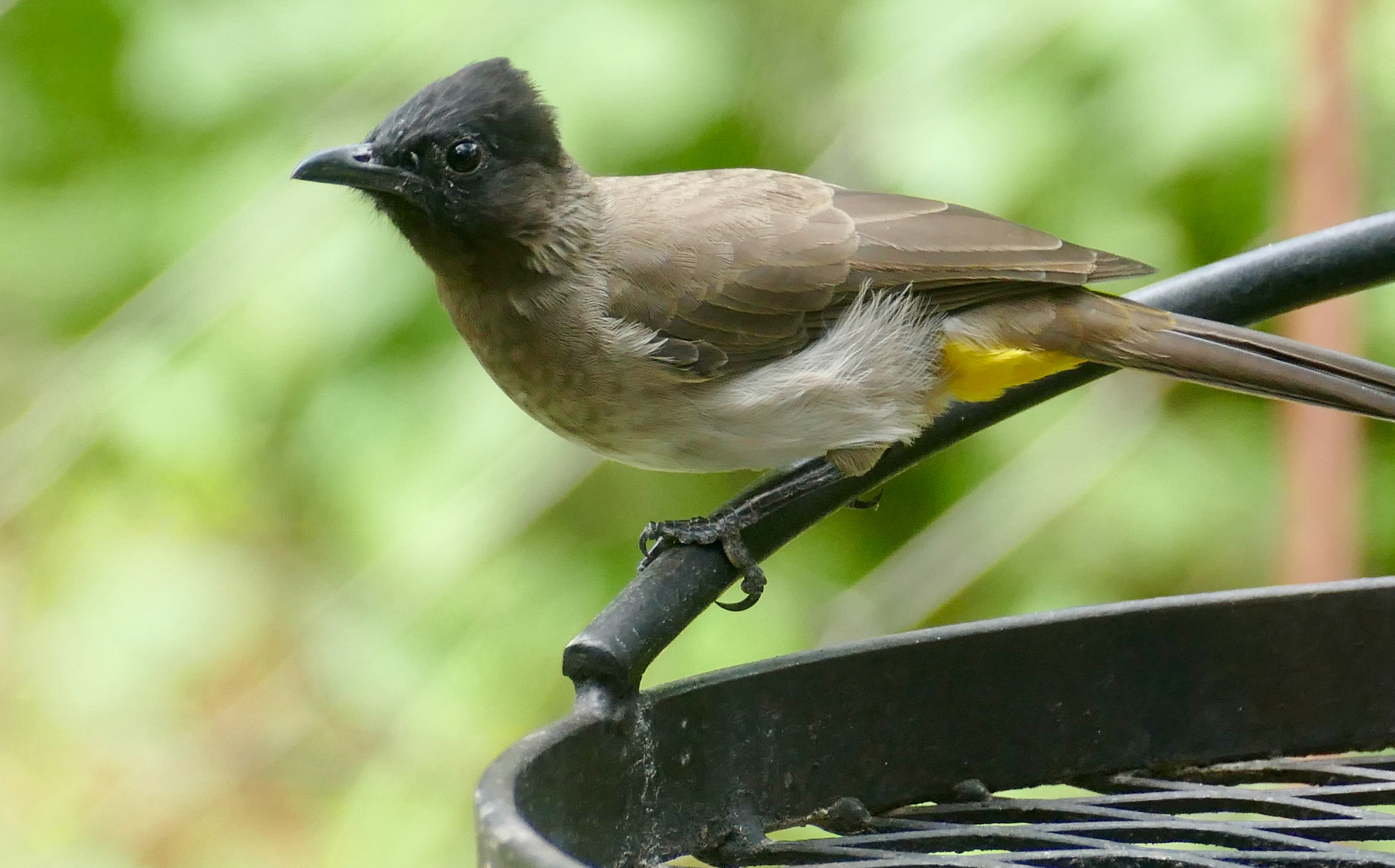
yellow-vented form, South Africa

== Description ==
The common bulbul is 18–20 cm (7.1–7.9 in) in length, with a long tail. The sexes are similar in plumage but the male is on average larger. It has a dark brown head and brown upperparts. The underparts are dull grey. The bill is fairly short and thin, with a slightly downwards curving upper mandible. The bill, legs, and feet are black and the eye is dark brown with a dark eye-ring, which is not readily visible. Subspecies P. b. dodsoni, P. b. spurius, P. b. tricolor and P. b. layardi have yellow undertail coverts. The call is a loud doctor-quick doctor-quick be-quick be-quick.

== Distribution and habitat ==
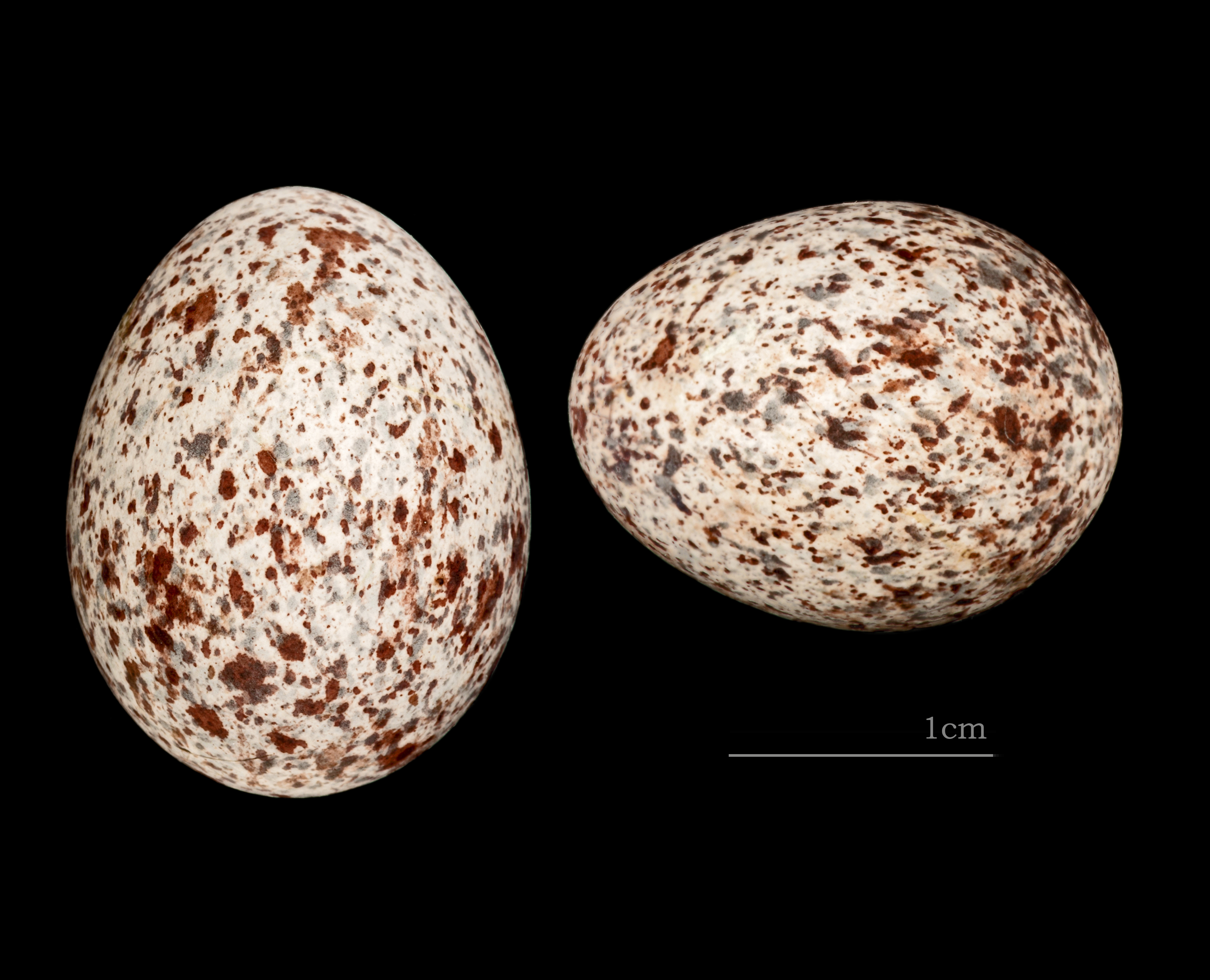
Eggs of Pycnonotus barbatus inornatus MHNT

It is a common resident breeder in much of Africa, and it has been found breeding in southern Spain at Tarifa. It is found in woodland, coastal bush, forest edges, riverine bush, montane scrub, and in mixed farming habitats. It is also found in exotic thickets, gardens, and parks.

== Behaviour and ecology ==
The common bulbul is usually seen in pairs or small groups. It is a conspicuous bird, which tends to sit at the top of a bush. As with other bulbuls they are active and noisy birds. The flight is bouncing and woodpecker-like.

=== Breeding ===
This species nests throughout the year in the moist tropics, elsewhere it is a more seasonal breeder with a peak in breeding coinciding with the onset of the rainy season. The nest is built by the female and is usually 1–5 m (3 ft 3 in – 16 ft 5 in) above ground, in a branch of a tree, generally away from the main trunk. The nest is fairly rigid, thick-walled and cup-shaped. The clutch is 2 to 5 eggs. These are incubated by the female starting when the clutch is complete and hatch after 12–15 days. The chicks are fed by both parents and leave the nest after 13–16 days although at this age they can barely fly. They are cared for by both parents until aged around 40 days. Nests are frequently parasitised by the Jacobin cuckoo.

=== Feeding ===
The common bulbul mostly eats fruit, but also consumes nectar, insects and seeds.
