= List of mammals of Singapore =

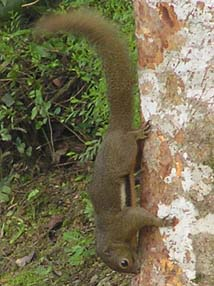
Plantain squirrel (Callosciurus notatus)

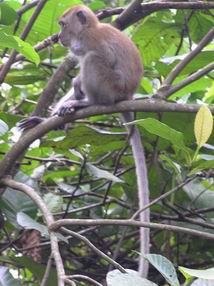
Long-tailed macaque (Macaca fascicularis)

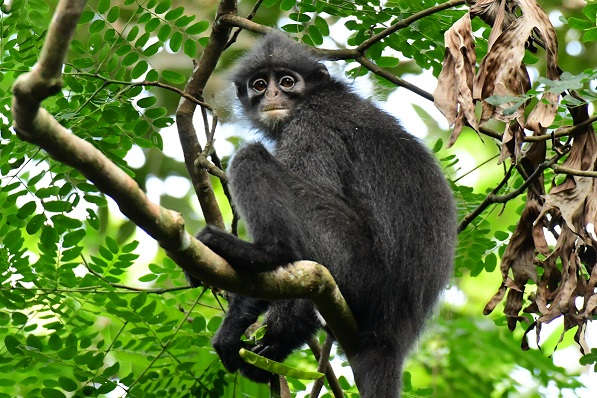
Raffles' banded langur (Presbytis femoralis) was almost extirpated in Singapore

There are currently about 65 species of mammals in Singapore. Since the founding years of modern Singapore in 1819, over 90 species have been recorded, including megafauna such as tigers, leopards and sambar deer. Most of these have since become locally extinct largely due to rapid urban development, with occasional large mammals such as Asian elephants swimming across the Straits of Johor from Johor, Malaysia.

Many surviving species have critically low population numbers, the most seriously endangered being the cream-coloured giant squirrel, last sighted in 1995 and now possibly extirpated. The Raffles' banded langur is also down to around 60 individuals. However, some species have been rediscovered in more remote parts of the country, such as the Malayan porcupine which was detected on Pulau Tekong in 2005, and the greater mouse-deer on Pulau Ubin in 2009.

The most commonly seen native mammals are the crab-eating macaque and plantain squirrel. The largest terrestrial mammal is the sambar deer, however, its population still remains extremely small. The wild boar is far more common, found in relatively large numbers throughout the main island, and also on the offshore islands of Pulau Ubin and Pulau Tekong. The largest marine mammals are species like the dugong and dolphins.

== Order Artiodactyla (even-toed ungulates) ==
Family Suidae (pigs)

- Wild boar (Sus scrofa) LC – Tuas, Jurong, Western Catchment, Lim Chu Kang, Kranji, Choa Chu Kang, Bukit Panjang, Bukit Batok, Bukit Timah, Central Catchment, Seletar, Sengkang, Punggol, Coney Island, Lorong Halus, Pasir Ris, Changi, Pulau Ubin, Pulau Tekong

Family Cervidae (deer)

- Sambar deer (Rusa unicolor) VU – Bukit Brown, Bukit Timah, Central Catchment
- Southern red muntjac (Muntiacus muntjak) LC – Central Catchment (possibly extirpated, recent sightings may be escapees from captivity), Pulau Tekong, unverified sighting

Family Tragulidae (mousedeer)

- Lesser mouse-deer (Tragulus kanchil) LC – Central Catchment
- Greater mouse-deer (Tragulus napu) LC – Pulau Ubin, Western Catchment

== Order Carnivora (carnivores) ==
Family Herpestidae (mongooses)

- Short-tailed mongoose (Urva brachyura) NT historical record is based on a specimen that is likely to have been an escapee

Family Viverridae (civets)

- Small-toothed palm civet (Arctogalidia trivirgata) LC – Bukit Timah, Central Catchment
- Otter civet (Cynogale bennettii) EN doubtful, based on old specimen without precise collection data
- Masked palm civet (Paguma larvata) LC indeterminate – Central Catchment Pulau Tekong, possible escapee (unverified sightings), Adam Road (roadkill in 2021)
- Asian palm civet (Paradoxurus hermaphroditus) LC – widespread across mainland Singapore in forests, woodlands, parks, and urban areas with trees, Pulau Ubin
- Large-spotted civet (Viverra megaspila) EN presence doubtful, historical record is likely based on misidentified Malay civet
- Malayan civet (Viverra tangalunga) LC – Central Catchment, possibly Pulau Tekong but has been confused with large Indian civet
- Large Indian civet (Viverra zibetha) LC indeterminate, Jalan Bahar, possibly Pulau Tekong but has been confused with Malay civet, unverified sightings from Central Catchment
- Small Indian civet (Viverricula indica) LC doubtful

Family Mustelidae (weasels, otters and relatives)

- Asian small-clawed otter (Aonyx cinereus) VU – Pulau Ubin, Pulau Tekong, sightings of lone individuals in mainland Singapore might be escapees from captivity
- Smooth-coated otter (Lutrogale perspicillata) VU – mangroves and coasts, rivers, canals, reservoirs, and lakes in many locations on mainland Singapore, also often seen travelling overland or hunting in ornamental fish ponds, Pulau Ubin, Sentosa, St. John's Island, Pulau Semakau

Family Felidae (cats)

- Sunda clouded leopard (Neofelis diardi) VU doubtful, based on single specimen claimed to have been killed in Changi in 1898
- Leopard cat (Prionailurus bengalensis) LC – Pulau Ubin, Pulau Tekong, Western Catchment, Central Catchment, Sungei Buloh
- Flat-headed cat (Prionailurus planiceps) EN presence doubtful, based on single specimen from former Raffles Museum collection that has since been lost

== Order Cetacea (cetaceans) ==
Family Delphinidae (marine dolphins)

- Common dolphin (Delphinus delphis) LC
- Irrawaddy dolphin (Orcaella brevirostris) – Singapore Strait EN
- False killer whale (Pseudorca crassidens) (vagrant) – Tuas NT
- Indo-Pacific humpback dolphin (Sousa chinensis) – Straits of Johor, Singapore Strait VU
- Indo-Pacific bottlenose dolphin (Tursiops aduncus) – Singapore Strait NT

Family Phocoenidae (porpoises)

- Finless porpoise (Neophocaena phocaenoides) – Singapore Strait VU

Family Physeteridae (sperm whale)

- Sperm whale (Physeter macrocephalus) (lone carcass in 2015) – Singapore Strait VU

== Order Chiroptera (bats) ==
Family Pteropodidae (Old World fruit bats)

- Lesser dog-faced fruit bat (Cynopterus brachyotis) - common and widespread LC
- Cave nectar bat (Eonycteris spelaea) - common and widespread LC
- Common long-tongued fruit bat (Macroglossus minimus) - Sungei Buloh, Pulau Ubin, Pulau Tekong LC
- Dusky fruit bat (Penthetor lucasi) – Bukit Timah LC
- Malayan flying fox (Pteropus vampyrus) (visitor, former resident) - Central Catchment, Hampstead Wetlands, Pulau Ubin NT
- Geoffroy's rousette (Rousettus amplexicaudatus) (indeterminate, possibly extirpated) LC

Family Emballonuridae (sheath-tailed bats)

- Lesser sheath-tailed bat (Emballonura monticola) – Bukit Timah, Pulau Ubin LC
- Pouched tomb bat (Saccolaimus saccolaimus) LC
- Long-winged tomb bat (Taphozous longimanus) – Pulau Ubin LC
- Black-bearded tomb bat (Taphozous melanopogon) LC

Family Nycteridae (hollow-faced bats)

- Southeast Asian hollow-faced bat (Nycteris tragata) – Central Catchment NT

Family Megadermatidae (false vampires)

- Lesser false vampire (Megaderma spasma) – Pulau Ubin, Pulau Tekong LC

Family Rhinolophidae (horseshoe bats)

- Glossy horseshoe bat (Rhinolophus refulgens) – Bukit Timah, Central Catchment LC
- Woolly horseshoe bat (Rhinolophus morio) - Central Catchment, Changi LC
- Lesser woolly horseshoe bat (Rhinolophus sedulus) (indeterminate, possibly extirpated) NT
- Lesser brown horseshoe bat (Rhinolophus stheno) (indeterminate, possibly extirpated) LC
- Trefoil horseshoe bat (Rhinolophus trifoliatus) – Central Catchment, Pulau Tekong NT

Family Hipposideridae (Old World leaf-nosed bats)

- Bicolored roundleaf bat (Hipposideros bicolor) – Bukit Timah LC
- Fawn roundleaf bat (Hipposideros cervinus) (indeterminate, possibly extirpated) LC
- Ashy roundleaf bat (Hipposideros cineraceus) – Pulau Ubin LC
- Ridley's roundleaf bat (Hipposideros ridleyi) (indeterminate, possibly extirpated) VU

Family Vespertilionidae (evening bats)

- Big-eared pipistrelle (Hypsugo macrotis) – Pulau Ubin DD
- Hardwicke's woolly bat (Kerivoula hardwickii) – Central Catchment, Pulau Tekong LC
- Brown tube-nosed bat (Murina suilla) – Pulau Tekong LC
- Horsfield's large-footed myotis (Myotis horsfieldii) – widespread LC
- Whiskered myotis (Myotis muricola) - widespread LC
- Singapore whiskered bat (Myotis oreias) – endemic to Singapore, possibly globally extinct, but might not be a valid taxon DD
- Javan pipistrelle (Pipistrellus javanicus) – widespread, recent records from Ayer Rajah, Paya Lebar, Punggol, Upper Thomson, Kent Ridge, Sentosa LC
- Narrow-winged pipistrelle (Pipistrellus stenopterus) – Singapore Botanic Gardens, Holland Village, Rochester Park, most recent record from Bukit Timah LC
- Asiatic lesser yellow bat (Scotophilus kuhlii) - common and widespread LC
- Lesser bamboo bat (Tylonycteris fulvida) – Bukit Timah LC
- Greater bamboo bat (Tylonycteris malayana) - widespread LC

Family Molossidae (free-tailed bats)

- Naked bulldog bat (Cheiromeles torquatus) – Bukit Timah, Central Catchment, Sembawang, Sentosa LC
- Wrinkle-lipped free-tailed bat (Chaerephon plicatus) (indeterminate, possibly extirpated) LC

== Order Dermoptera (colugo) ==
Family Cynocephalidae (colugo)

- Malayan colugo or Malayan flying lemur (Galeopterus variegatus) – Bukit Timah, Bukit Batok, Central Catchment, Bukit Brown, Gallop Road, Portsdown, Changi LC

== Order Eulipotyphla (insectivores) ==
Family Soricidae (shrews)

- Malayan shrew (Crocidura malayana) – Bukit Timah, Central Catchment LC
- House shrew (Suncus murinus) – urban LC

Family Erinaceidae (hedgehogs and gymnures)

- Moonrat (Echinosorex gymnura) (doubtful - based on single specimen from former Raffles Museum collection that has since been lost) LC

== Order Perissodactyla (odd-toed ungulates) ==
Family Tapiridae (tapirs)

- Malayan tapir (Tapirus indicus) (vagrant) – Pulau Ubin, Changi, Punggol EN

== Order Pholidota (pangolins) ==
Family Manidae (pangolins)

- Sunda pangolin (Manis javanica) – CR; occurs in Bukit Timah, Bukit Batok, Bukit Panjang, Central Catchment, Pulau Ubin, Pulau Tekong, Western Catchment, Labrador, may wander into built-up areas

== Order Primates (primates) ==
Family Lorisidae (lorises)

- Sunda slow loris (Nycticebus coucang) EN – Bukit Timah, Central Catchment, Pulau Tekong

Family Cercopithecidae (Old World monkeys)

- Crab-eating macaque (Macaca fascicularis) VU – Bukit Timah, Central Catchment, Sungei Buloh, Western Catchment, Bukit Batok, Woodlands Waterfront, Admiralty Park, Punggol, Coney Island, Pulau Ubin, Pulau Tekong, Sentosa, Sisters Islands; lone individuals and small groups occasionally seen in parks and urban areas elsewhere in Singapore
- Southern pig-tailed macaque (Macaca nemestrina) EN (doubtful, historical records in Singapore are likely to be based on escapees from captivity), Tengeh Reservoir, individual seen in 2020
- Raffles' banded langur (Presbytis femoralis) CR – (endemic) around 70 left in Central Catchment, Upper Thomson
- Dusky leaf monkey (Trachypithecus obscurus) EN – Kent Ridge, likely escapee in 2008; Central Catchment, colonisation in 2019 with the appearance of a trio which likely originated from Johor.

== Order Proboscidea (elephants) ==
Family Elephantidae (elephants)

- Asian elephant (Elephas maximus) EN (vagrant) Pulau Tekong (1990), Pulau Ubin (1991)

== Order Rodentia (rodents) ==
Family Muridae (mice and rats)

- House mouse (Mus musculus) LC – urban
- Rajah spiny rat (Maxomys rajah) VU – Central Catchment
- Polynesian rat (Rattus exulans]) LC – urban, forest edge
- Brown rat (Rattus norvegicus) LC (introduced) – urban
- Tanezumi rat (Rattus tanezumi) LC – urban, forest edge
- Malayan field rat (Rattus tiomanicus) LC
- Annandale's rat (Sundamys annandalei) LC – Bukit Timah, Central Catchment, Pulau Ubin

Family Spalacidae (mole-rats)

- Large bamboo rat (Rhizomys sumatrensis) LC doubtful, historical records are likely escapees

Family Sciuridae (squirrels)

- Finlayson's squirrel (Callosciurus finlaysonii) LC (introduced) – Bidadari, Woodleigh
- Plantain squirrel (Callosciurus notatus) LC – widespread and common on mainland, Sentosa, Pulau Tekong, Pulau Ubin, Pulau Semakau
- Prevost's squirrel (Callosciurus prevostii) LC (presence uncertain)
- Red-cheeked flying squirrel (Hylopetes spadiceus) LC – Bukit Timah, Central Catchment
- Javanese flying squirrel (Iomys horsfieldii) LC – Bukit Batok, Bukit Timah, Central Catchment
- Red giant flying squirrel (Petaurista petaurista) LC possibly extirpated
- Shrew-faced squirrel (Rhinosciurus laticaudatus) NT – Bukit Timah, Central Catchment
- Slender squirrel (Sundasciurus tenuis) LC – Bukit Timah, Bukit Batok, Central Catchment, Singapore Botanic Gardens

Family Hystricidae (Old World porcupines)

- Malayan porcupine (Hystrix brachyura) LC – Pulau Tekong, Pulau Ubin, Bukit Timah, Central Catchment, Western Catchment

== Order Scandentia (treeshrews) ==
Family Tupaiidae (treeshrews)

- Common treeshrew (Tupaia glis) LC – Bukit Timah, Central Catchment, Singapore Botanic Gardens, Portsdown, Bidadari, Bedok, Bukit Batok, Jurong Hill, Kent Ridge, Sungei Buloh, Western Catchment, Pulau Ubin

== Order Sirenia (sea cows) ==
Family Dugongidae (dugong)

- Dugong (Dugong dugon) VU – Straits of Johor, Singapore Strait

== Extirpated species ==
- Binturong (Arctictis binturong) VU
- Dhole (Cuon alpinus) EN
- Sun bear (Helarctos malayanus) VU unverified sightings on Pulau Tekong in 1980s
- Three-striped ground squirrel (Lariscus insignis) LC
- Hairy-nosed otter (Lutra sumatrana) EN
- Red spiny rat (Maxomys surifer) LC formerly recorded in Bukit Timah
- Leopard (Panthera pardus) unverified sightings on Pulau Tekong in 1980s VU
- Tiger (Panthera tigris) EN
- Cream-coloured giant squirrel (Ratufa affinis) NT formerly recorded in Bukit Timah, Central Catchment
- Bornean bearded pig (Sus barbatus) – no historical records but likely formerly present due to records from Johor and Riau Islands, and ability to reach islands by swimming

== See also ==
- List of birds of Singapore
- List of reptiles of Singapore
- List of amphibians of Singapore
