= Brown bulbul =

Brown bulbul may refer to species in the bulbul family of birds:

- Asian red-eyed bulbul (Pycnonotus brunneus), found in south-eastern Asia
- Common bulbul (Pycnonotus barbatus), found in Africa
