= List of amphibians of Singapore =

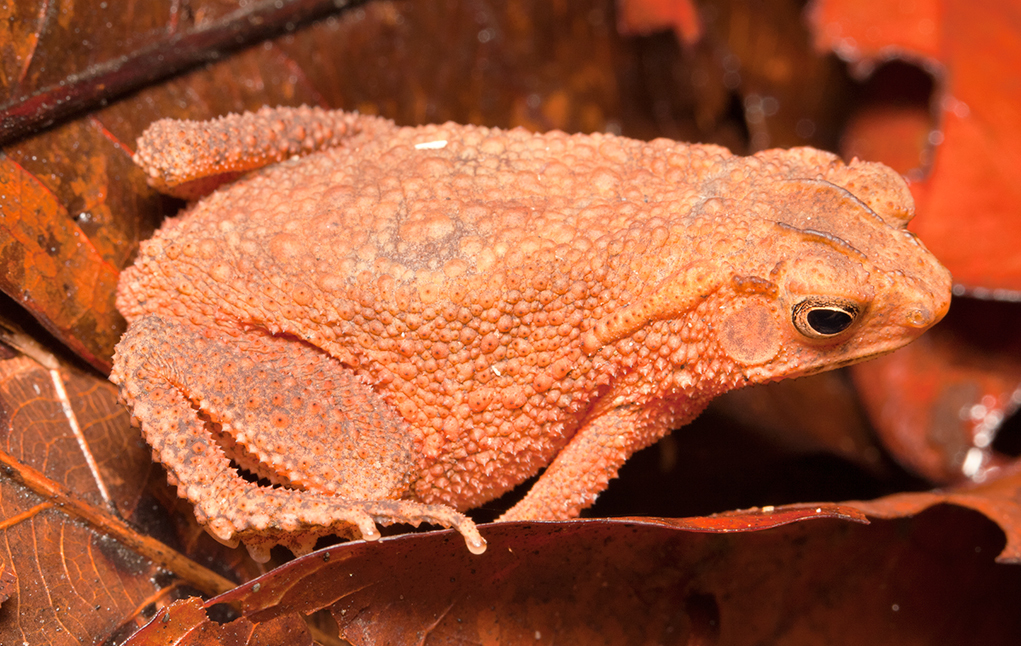
Four-ridged Toad Ingerophrynus quadriporcatus at Venus Drive

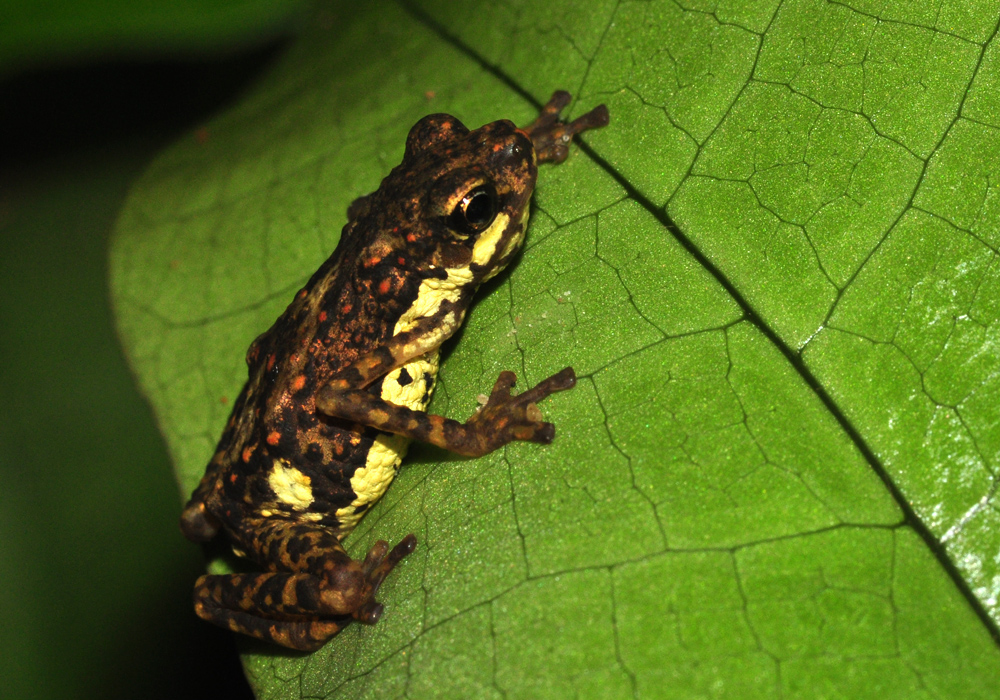
St Andrew's Cross Toadlet Pelophryne brevipes - adult male

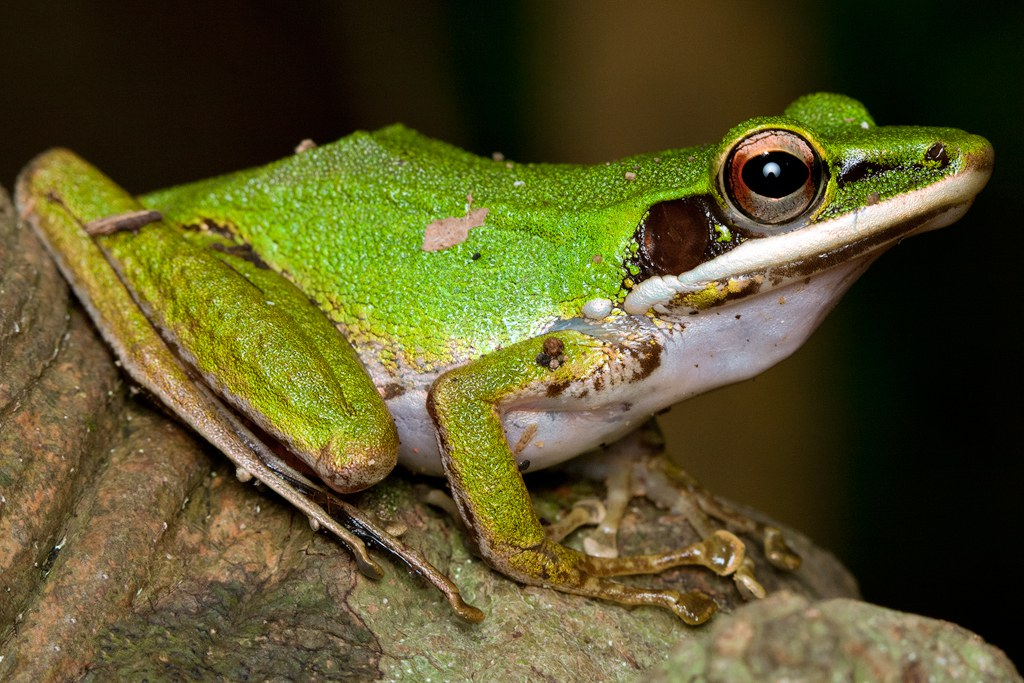
Copper-cheeked Frog Hydrophylax raniceps that was found near a stream along a trail in Venus Drive

There are about 30 species of amphibians in Singapore. Amphibians are aquatic vertebrates. They need water to survive. They include frogs, toads, newts, salamanders and caecilians. But Singapore does not have newts and salamanders.

The most common amphibians one is likely to encounter are the Asian toad and banded bullfrog. Some species are common in forested areas, like the black-eyed litter frog.

== List of amphibians ==
=== Order Anura (frogs and toads) ===
==== Family Bufonidae (toads) ====
- Asian toad (Duttaphrynus melanostictus) - Common - Singapore Island, Sentosa, Pulau Semakau, Pulau Ubin, Pulau Tekong
- Four-ridged toad (Ingerophrynus quadriporcatus) - Common - Central Catchment Nature Reserve, Western Catchment, Pulau Tekong
- Saint Andrew's Cross toadlet (Pelophryne ingeri) - Rare - Bukit Timah Nature Reserve

==== Family Megophryidae (litter frogs) ====
- Black-eyed litter frog (Leptobrachium nigrops) - Common - Bukit Timah Nature Reserve, Central Catchment Nature Reserve
- Malayan horned frog (Pelobatrachus nasutus) - Rare - Bukit Timah Nature Reserve, Central Catchment Nature Reserve

==== Family Dicroglossidae (fanged frogs) ====
- Crab-eating frog (Fejervarya cancrivora) - Common - Singapore Island, Sentosa, Pulau Semakau, Pulau Ubin, Pulau Tekong
- Field frog (Fejervarya limnocharis) - Common - Singapore Island, Sentosa, Pulau Semakau, Pulau Ubin, Pulau Tekong
- Malayan giant frog (Limnonectes blythii) - Uncommon - Bukit Timah Nature Reserve, Bukit Batok, Bukit Gombak, Central Catchment Nature Reserve, Sungei Buloh Wetland Reserve, Western Catchment, Singapore Botanic Gardens, Admiralty Park, Clementi Forest
- Malesian frog (Limnonectes malesianus) - Uncommon - Bukit Timah Nature Reserve, Central Catchment Nature Reserve, Western Catchment
- Masked swamp frog (Limnonectes paramacrodon) - Rare - Central Catchment Nature Reserve, Pulau Tekong
- Rhinoceros frog (Limnonectes plicatellus) - Rare - Bukit Timah Nature Reserve, Central Catchment Nature Reserve
- Yellow-bellied puddle frog (Occidozyga sumatrana) - Uncommon - Bukit Timah Nature Reserve, Central Catchment Nature Reserve, Western Catchment, Pulau Tekong

==== Family Ranidae (true frogs) ====
- Copper-cheeked frog (Chalcorana labialis) - Common - Bukit Timah Nature Reserve, Central Catchment Nature Reserve, Western Catchment, Pulau Tekong
- Common greenback (Hylarana erythraea) - Common - Singapore Island, Sentosa, Pulau Ubin, Pulau Tekong
- Golden-eared rough-sided frog (Pulchrana baramica) - Uncommon - Central Catchment Nature Reserve, Pulau Tekong
- Masked rough-sided frog (Pulchrana laterimaculata) - Common - Bukit Timah Nature Reserve, Central Catchment Nature Reserve, Holland Woods, Pulau Tekong (unconfirmed)
- American bullfrog (Lithobates catesbeianus) - Introduced
- Günther's frog (Sylvirana guentheri) - Introduced - Singapore Island

==== Family Rhacophoridae (gliding frogs) ====
- Cinnamon bush frog (Nyctixalus pictus) - Rare - Bukit Timah Nature Reserve, Central Catchment Nature Reserve, Singapore Botanic Gardens
- Four-lined tree frog (Polypedates leucomystax) - Common - Singapore Island, Sentosa, Lazarus Island, Pulau Semakau, Pulau Ubin, Pulau Tekong
- Blue-spotted tree frog (Leptomantis cyanopunctatus) - Rare - Central Catchment Nature Reserve
- Thorny tree frog (Theloderma horridum) - Rare - Bukit Timah Nature Reserve, Central Catchment Nature Reserve

==== Family Microhylidae (narrow-mouthed frogs) ====
- Lim's black-spotted sticky frog (Kalophrynus limbooliati) - Uncommon - Bukit Timah Nature Reserve, Central Catchment Nature Reserve, Sentosa
- Banded bullfrog (Kaloula pulchra) - Introduced - Singapore Island, Sentosa, St. John's Island, Lazarus Island, Pulau Semakau, Pulau Ubin, Pulau Tekong
- Painted chorus frog (Microhyla butleri) - Common - Singapore Island, Sentosa, Pulau Ubin, Pulau Tekong
- Dark-sided chorus frog (Microhyla heymonsi) - Common - Singapore Island, Sentosa, Pulau Ubin, Pulau Tekong
- Mukhlesur's chorus frog (Microhyla mukhlesuri) - Introduced - Singapore Island, Sentosa, Pulau Tekong
- Manthey's chorus frog (Microhyla mantheyi) - Rare - Central Catchment Nature Reserve
- Subaraj's paddy frog (Micryletta subaraji) - Rare - Kranji, Central Catchment Nature Reserve

==== Family Hylidae (tree frogs) ====
- Australian green tree frog (Ranoidea caerulea) - Escapee - Lim Chu Kang

==== Family Eleutherodactylidae (rain frogs) ====
- Greenhouse frog (Eleutherodactylus planirostris) - Introduced - Singapore Island, Sentosa

=== Order Gymnophiona (caecilians) ===
==== Family Ichthyophiidae (Asian caecilians) ====
- Yellow-banded caecilian (Ichthyophis paucisulcus) - Rare - Bukit Timah Nature Reserve, Central Catchment Nature Reserve
- Singapore Black caecilian (Ichthyophis singaporensis) - Status uncertain

== See also ==
- List of mammals of Singapore
- List of birds of Singapore
- List of reptiles of Singapore
