= Rhinolophus refulgens =

Scientific classification
- Kingdom: Animalia
- Phylum: Chordata
- Class: Mammalia
- Order: Chiroptera
- Family: Rhinolophidae
- Genus: Rhinolophus
- Species: R. refulgens

Binomial name
- Rhinolophus refulgens Andersen, 1905

Species of bat

Rhinolophus refulgens, or the glossy horseshoe bat, is a species of horseshoe bat in the genus Rhinolophus and the family Rhinolophidae described by Knud Andersen in 1905.

== Roosting ==
These bats like to roost in caves, boulder crevices, and man-made structures such as tunnels.

== Range ==
Rhinolophus refulgens can be found in peninsular Malaysia, Thailand and from Singapore to Sumatra.

== Diet ==
These bats feed on insects at night.
