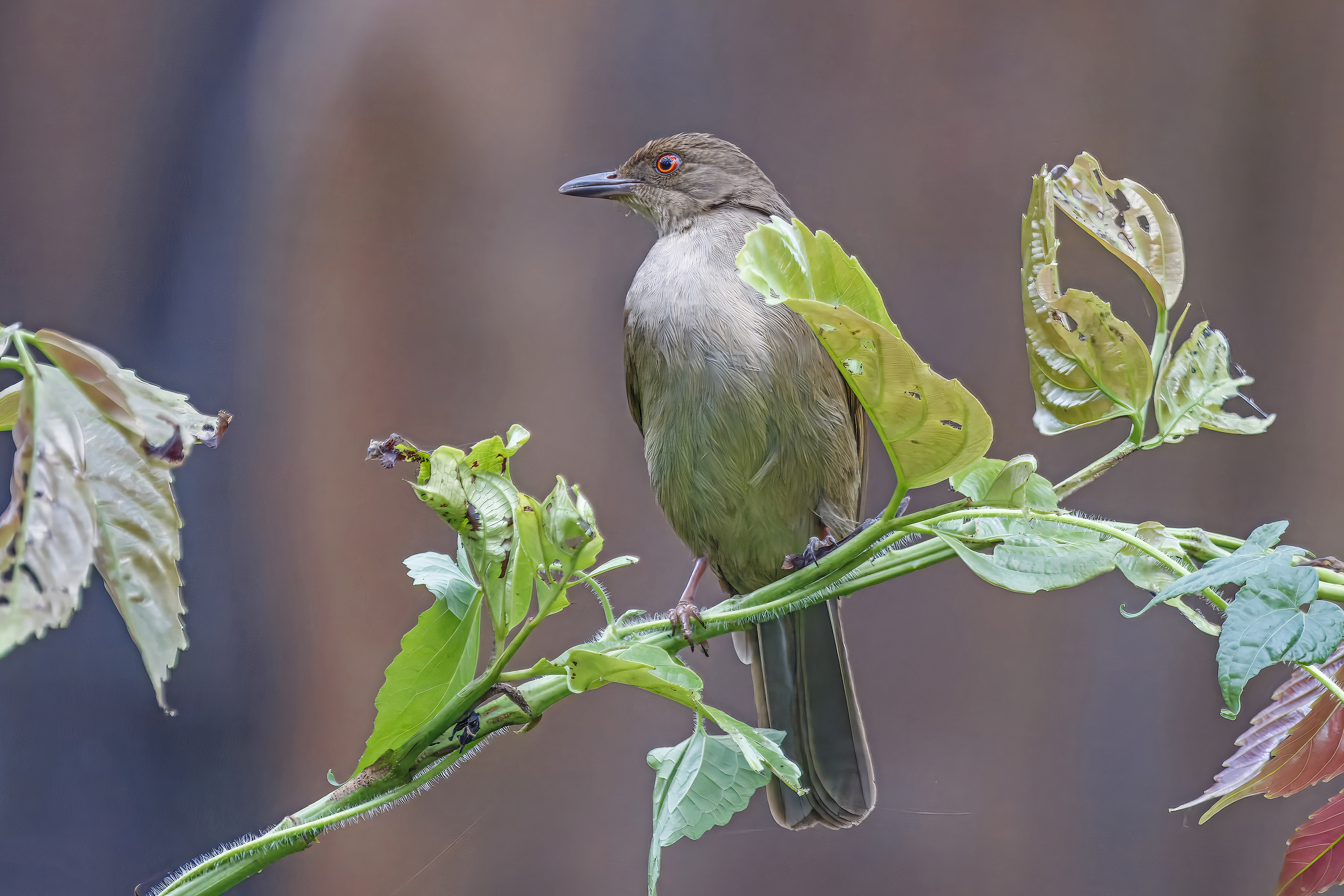
- at Sepilok, Borneo

Conservation status
- Least Concern (IUCN 3.1)

Scientific classification
- Kingdom: Animalia
- Phylum: Chordata
- Class: Aves
- Order: Passeriformes
- Family: Pycnonotidae
- Genus: Pycnonotus
- Species: P. brunneus

Binomial name
- Pycnonotus brunneus Blyth, 1845
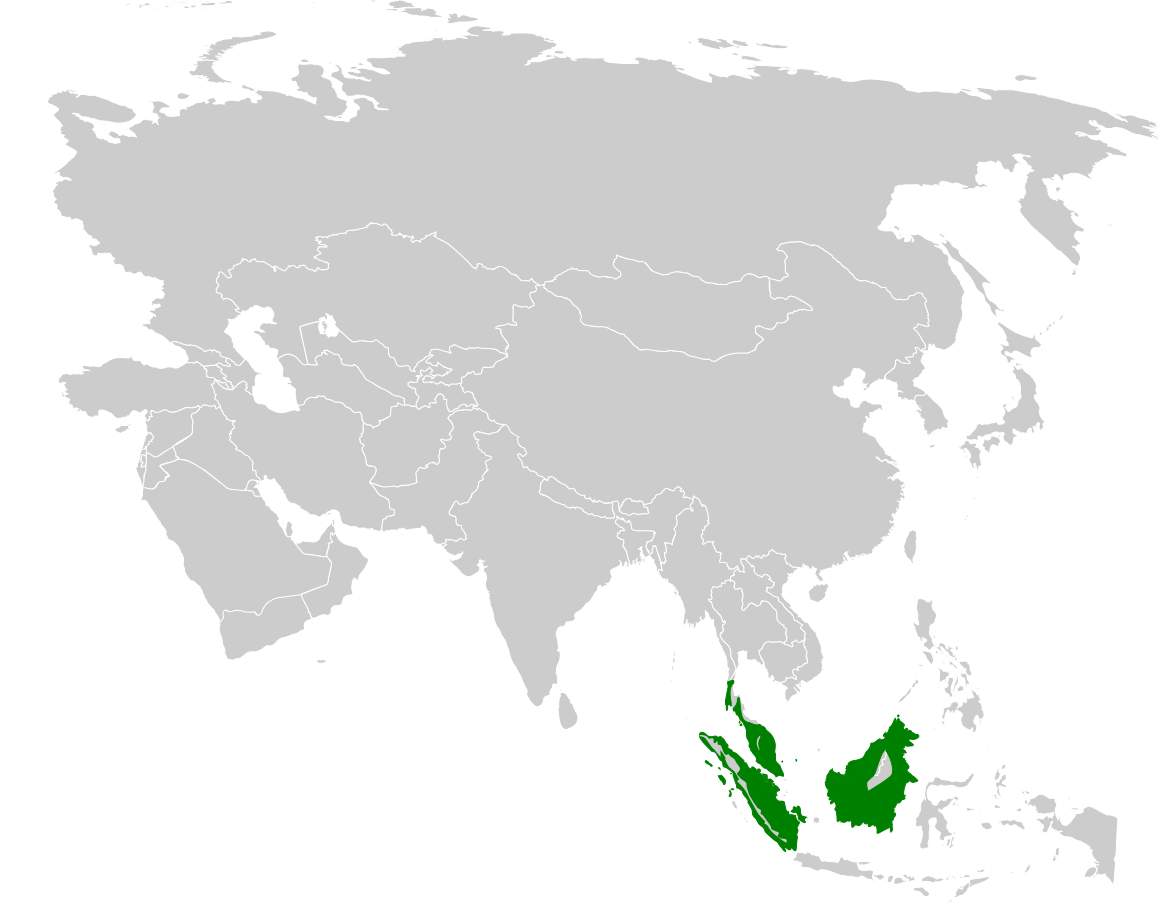

= Asian red-eyed bulbul =

Species of bird

The Asian red-eyed bulbul (Pycnonotus brunneus) is a member of the bulbul family of passerine birds. It is found on the Malay Peninsula, Sumatra, and Borneo. Its natural habitat is subtropical or tropical moist lowland forests.

== Taxonomy and systematics ==
Alternate names for the Asian red-eyed bulbul include the brown bulbul (also used for the common bulbul), red-eyed brown bulbul, and red-eyed bulbul (also used for the African red-eyed bulbul).

=== Subspecies ===
Two subspecies are recognized:

- P. b. brunneus - Blyth, 1845: Found from the Malay Peninsula to Sumatra and Borneo and nearby islands
- P. b. zapolius - Oberholser, 1917: Found on the Anambas Islands
