= List of birds of Pakistan =

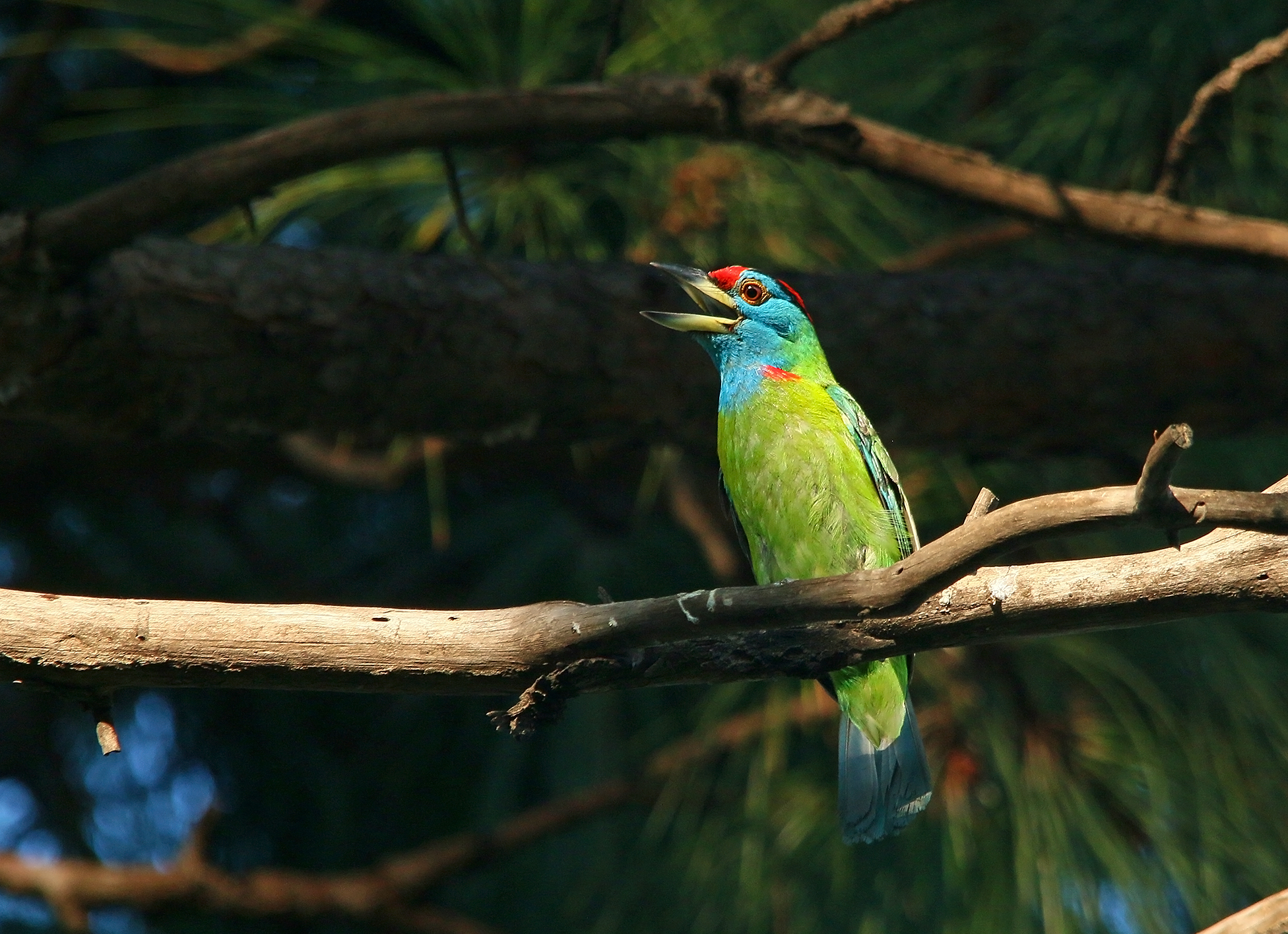
Blue-throated barbet in the Margalla Hills.

This is a list of the bird species recorded in Pakistan. The avifauna of Pakistan include a total of 793 species. The chukar (Alectoris chukar) is the official national bird of Pakistan, and the shaheen falcon is the symbolic icon of the Pakistan Air Force and Pakistan Avicultural Foundation, one bird is endemic.

This list's taxonomic treatment (designation and sequence of orders, families and species) and nomenclature (common and scientific names) generally follow the conventions of The Clements Checklist of Birds of the World, 2022 edition. The family accounts at the beginning of each heading reflect this taxonomy, as do the species counts found in each family account. Accidental species are included in the total species count for Pakistan.

The following tags have been used to highlight several categories. The commonly occurring native species do not fall into any of these categories.

- (V) Vagrant - a species that rarely or accidentally occurs in Pakistan
- (Ex) Extirpated - a species that no longer occurs in Pakistan but exists in other places

== Ducks, geese, and waterfowl ==
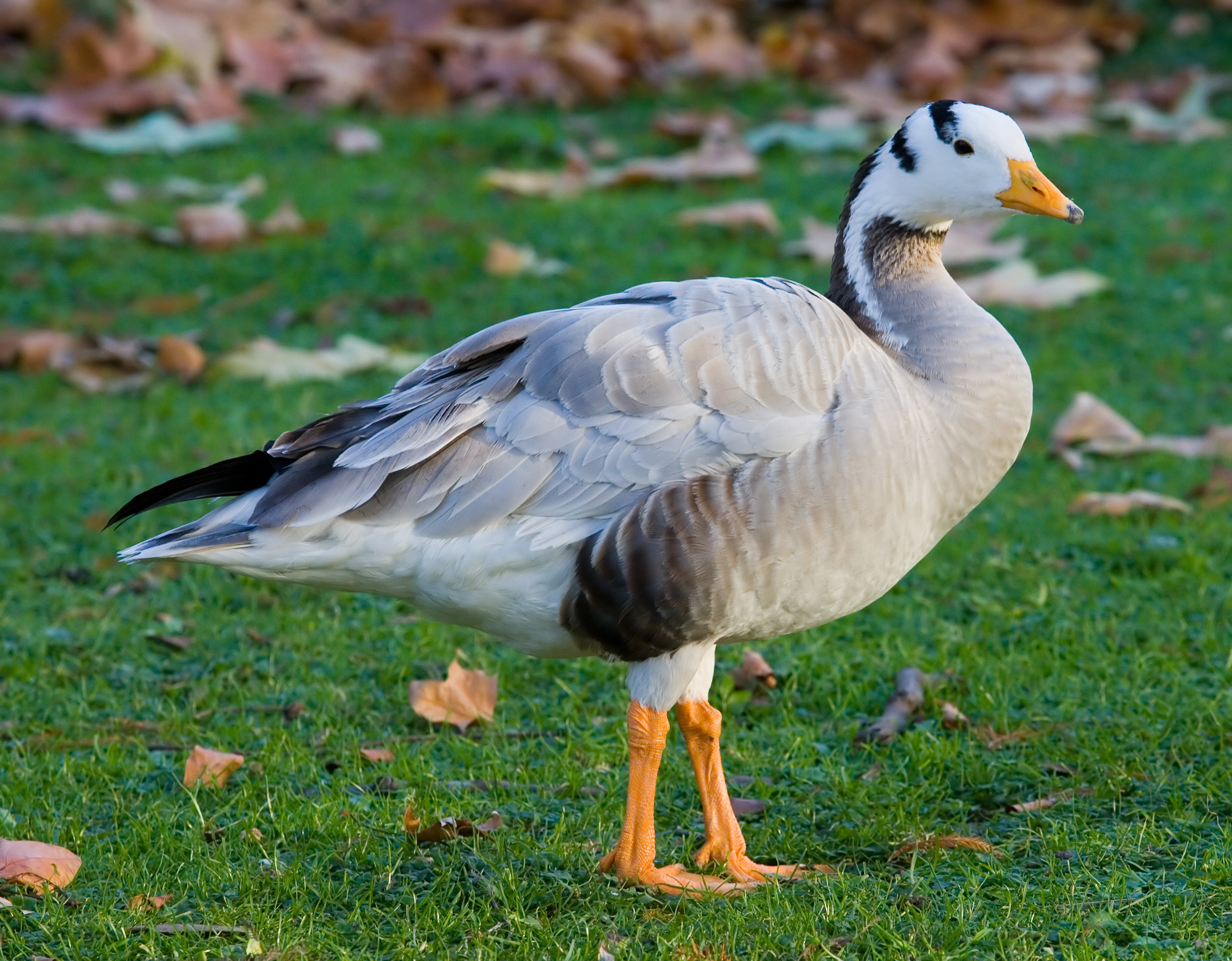
Bar-headed goose winter in the wetlands of Pakistan

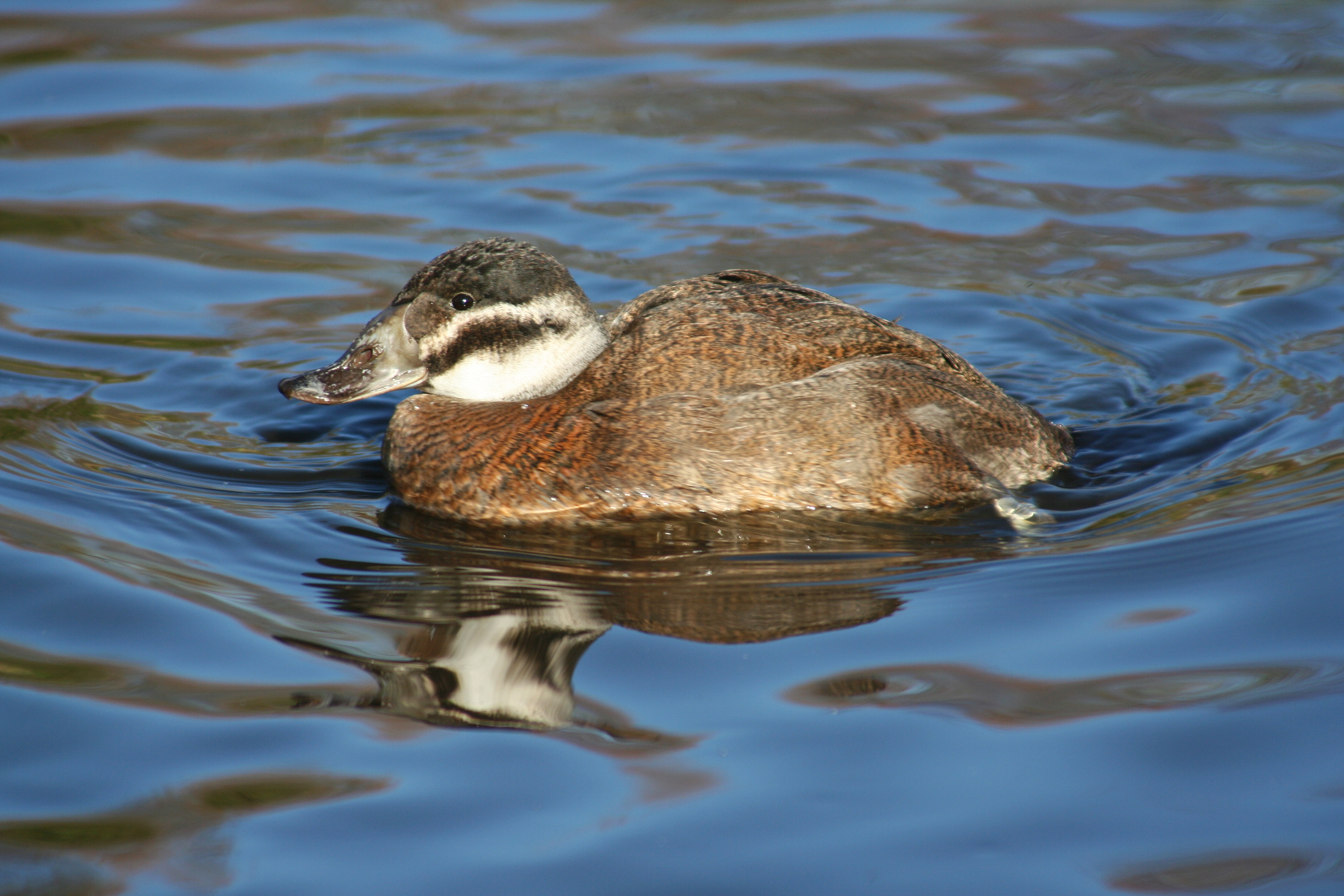
Pakistan has the largest concentration of wintering white-headed duck in South Asia

Order: Anseriformes Family: Anatidae

Anatidae includes the ducks and most duck-like waterfowl, such as geese and swans. These birds are adapted to an aquatic existence with webbed feet, flattened bills, and feathers that are excellent at shedding water due to an oily coating.

- Fulvous whistling-duck, Dendrocygna bicolor
- Lesser whistling-duck, Dendrocygna javanica
- Greater white-fronted goose, Anser albifrons
- Lesser white-fronted goose, Anser erythropus
- Bar-headed goose, Anser indicus
- Graylag goose, Anser anser
- Mute swan, Cygnus olor (V)
- Tundra swan, Cygnus columbianus (V)
- Whooper swan, Cygnus cygnus
- Knob-billed duck, Sarkidiornis melanotos
- Ruddy shelduck, Tadorna ferruginea
- Common shelduck, Tadorna tadorna
- Cotton pygmy-goose, Nettapus coromandelianus
- Baikal teal, Sibirionetta formosa (V)
- Garganey, Spatula querquedula
- Northern shoveler, Spatula clypeata
- Gadwall, Mareca strepera
- Falcated duck, Mareca falcata
- Eurasian wigeon, Mareca penelope
- Indian spot-billed duck, Anas poecilorhyncha
- Mallard, Anas platyrhynchos
- Northern pintail, Anas acuta
- Green-winged teal, Anas crecca
- Marbled teal, Marmaronetta angustirostris
- Red-crested pochard, Netta rufina
- Common pochard, Aythya ferina
- Ferruginous duck, Aythya nyroca
- Baer's pochard, Aythya baeri (V)
- Tufted duck, Aythya fuligula
- Greater scaup, Aythya marila
- Velvet scoter, Melanitta fusca
- Long-tailed duck, Clangula hyemalis
- Common goldeneye, Bucephala clangula
- Smew, Mergellus albellus
- Common merganser, Mergus merganser
- Red-breasted merganser, Mergus serrator
- White-headed duck, Oxyura leucocephala

== Pheasants, grouse, and allies ==
Order: Galliformes Family: Phasianidae

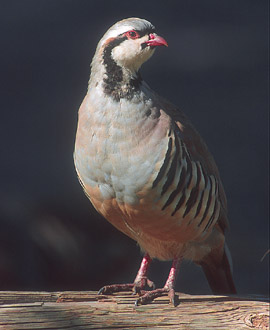
The chukar is officially recognized, as the national bird of Pakistan.

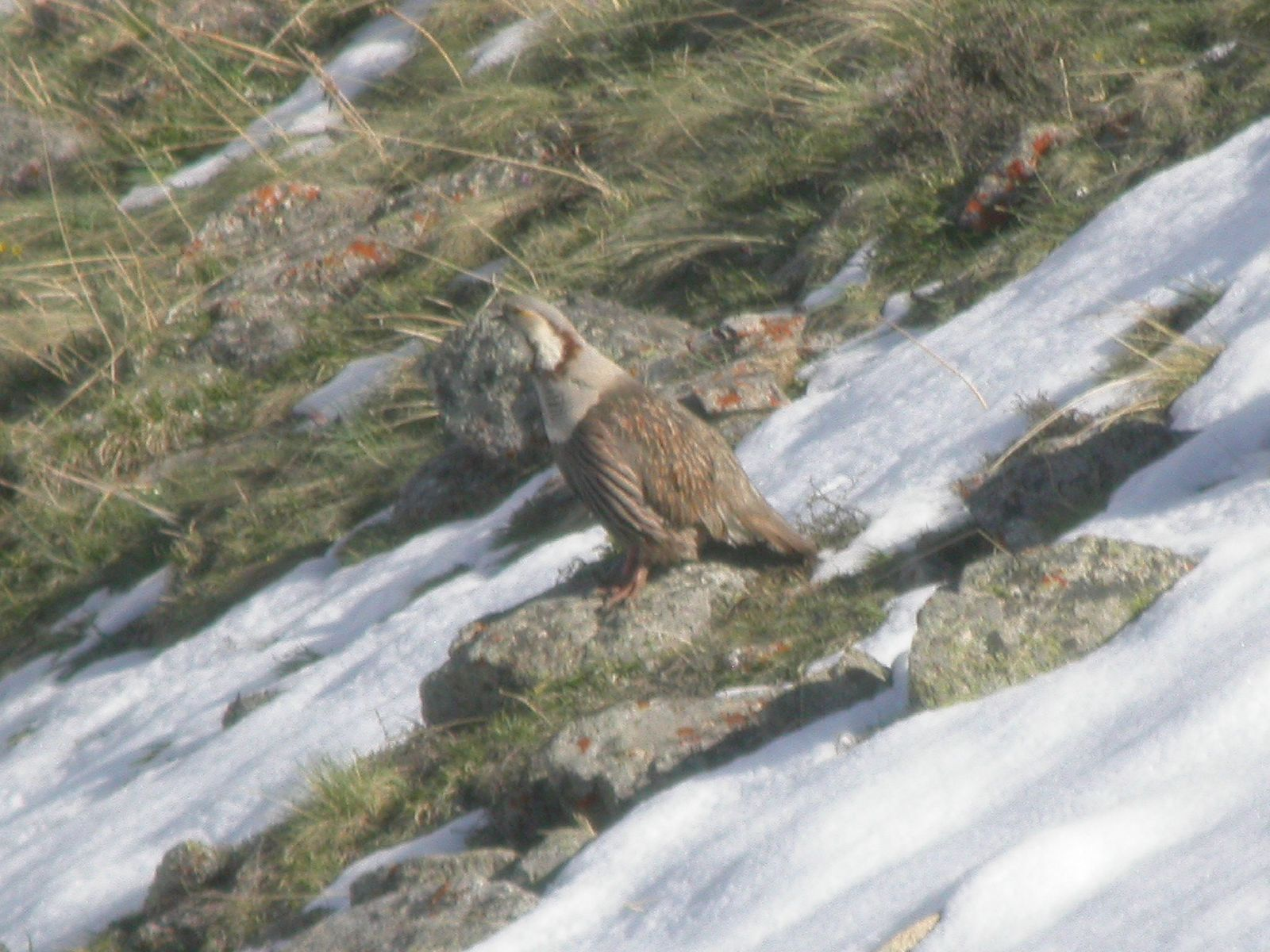
Himalayan snowcock

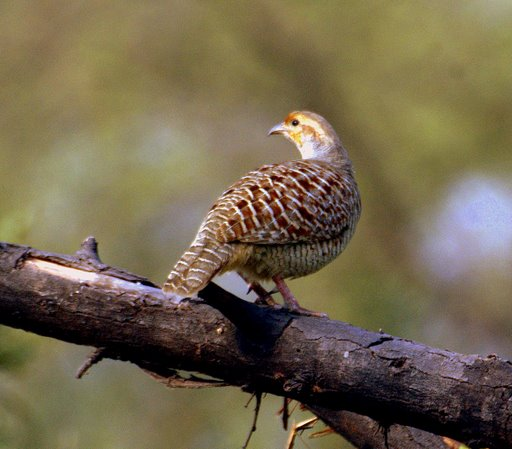
Gray francolin

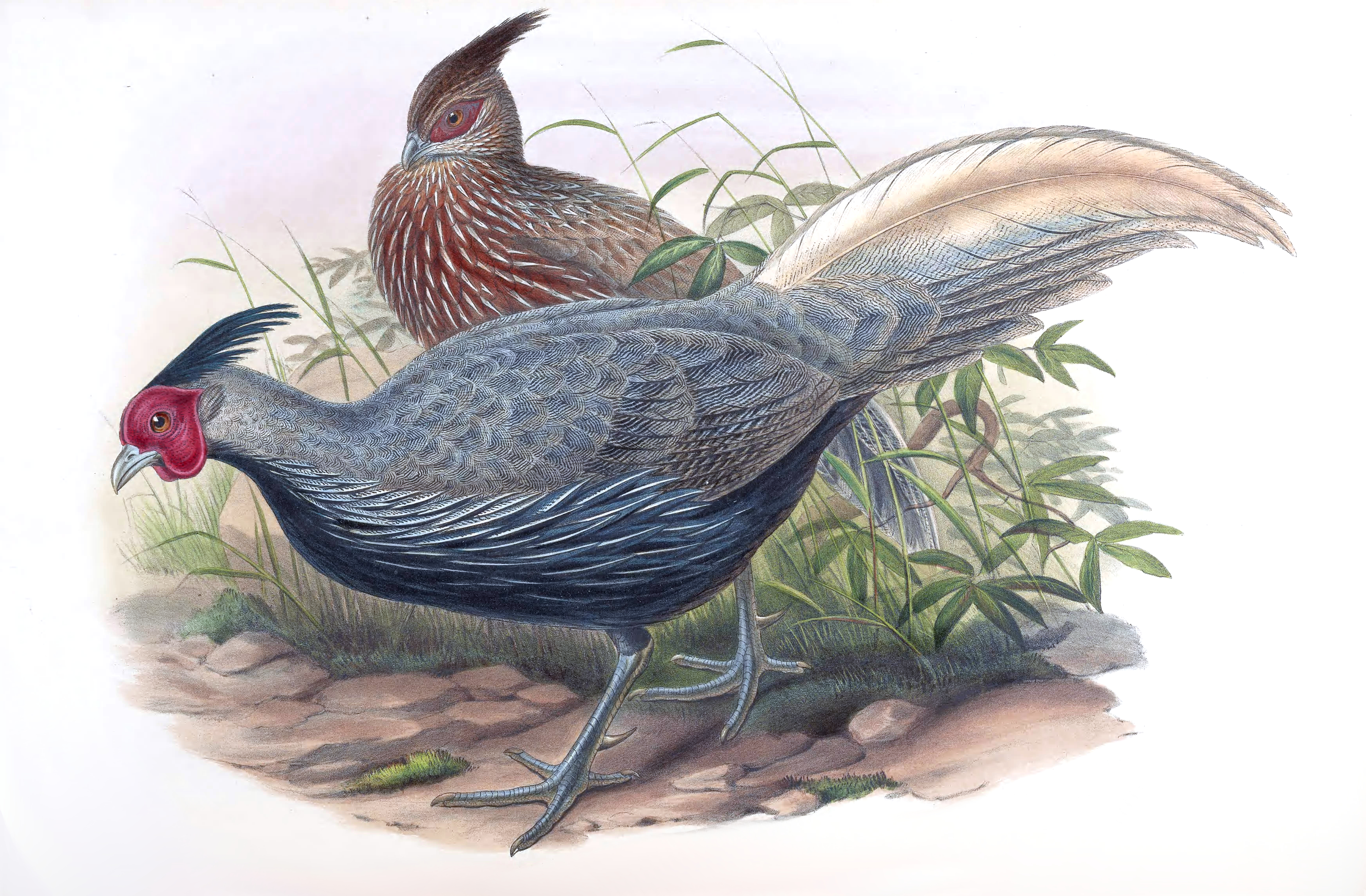
The kalij pheasant is the provincial bird of Afghania.

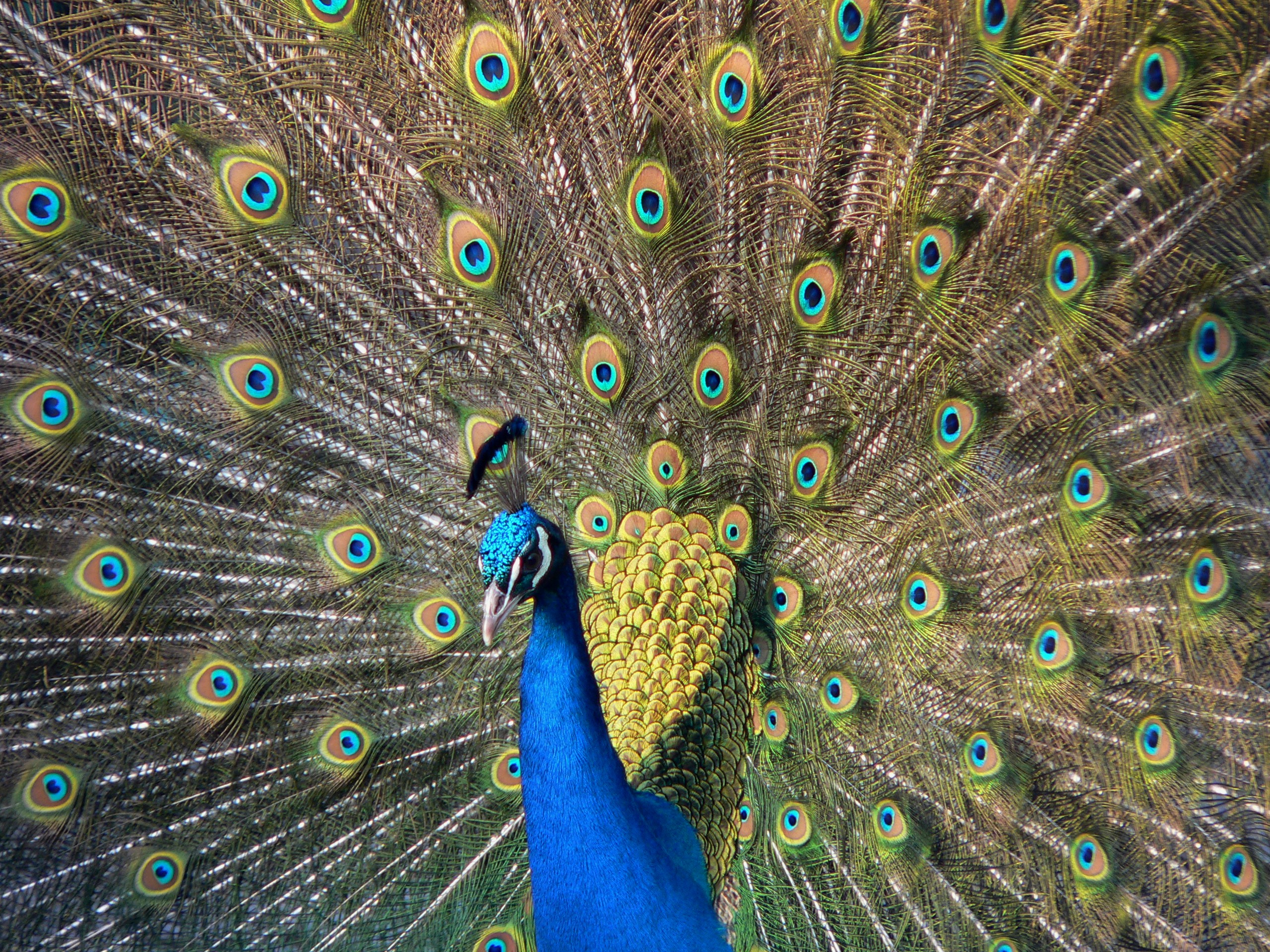
The Indian peafowl is the provincial bird of Punjab.

The Phasianidae are a family of terrestrial birds which consists of quails, partridges, snowcocks, francolins, spurfowls, tragopans, monals, pheasants, peafowls and jungle fowls. In general, they are plump (although they vary in size) and have broad, relatively short wings. Of most species the numbers have declined considerably over the last decade.

- Indian peafowl, Pavo cristatus
- See-see partridge, Ammoperdix griseogularis
- Common quail, Coturnix coturnix
- Rain quail, Coturnix coromandelica
- Chukar, Alectoris chukar, national bird of Pakistan
- Tibetan snowcock, Tetraogallus tibetanus
- Himalayan snowcock, Tetraogallus himalayensis
- Jungle bush-quail, Perdicula asiatica
- Black francolin, Francolinus francolinus
- Gray francolin, Ortygornis pondicerianus
- Red junglefowl, Gallus gallus
- Himalayan monal, Lophophorus impejanus
- Snow partridge, Lerwa lerwa
- Western tragopan, Tragopan melanocephalus
- Cheer pheasant, Catreus wallichii
- Kalij pheasant, Lophura leucomelanos
- Koklass pheasant, Pucrasia macrolopha

== Flamingos ==
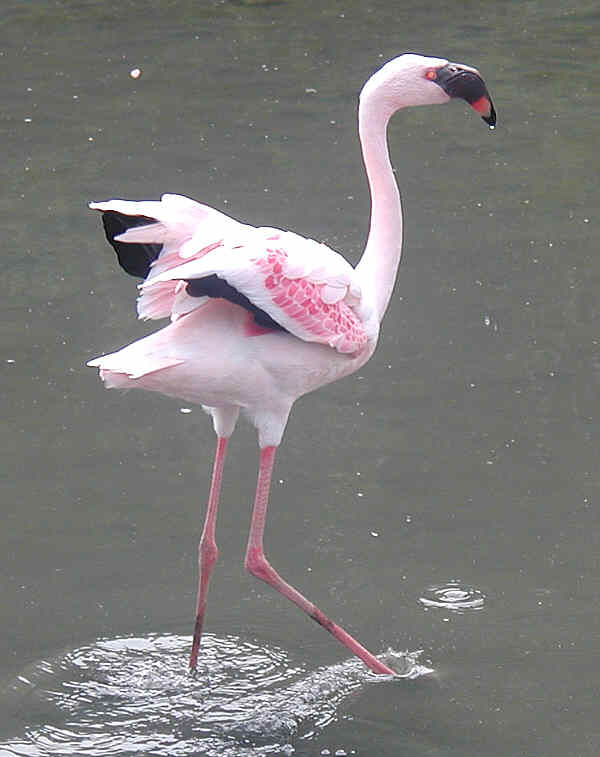
Lesser flamingo

Order: Phoenicopteriformes Family: Phoenicopteridae

Flamingos are gregarious wading birds, usually 3 to 5 feet (0.9 to 1.5 m) tall, found in both the Western and Eastern Hemispheres. Flamingos filter-feed on shellfish and algae. Their oddly shaped beaks are specially adapted to separate mud and silt from the food they consume and, uniquely, are used upside-down.

- Greater flamingo, Phoenicopterus roseus
- Lesser flamingo, Phoenicopterus minor

== Grebes ==
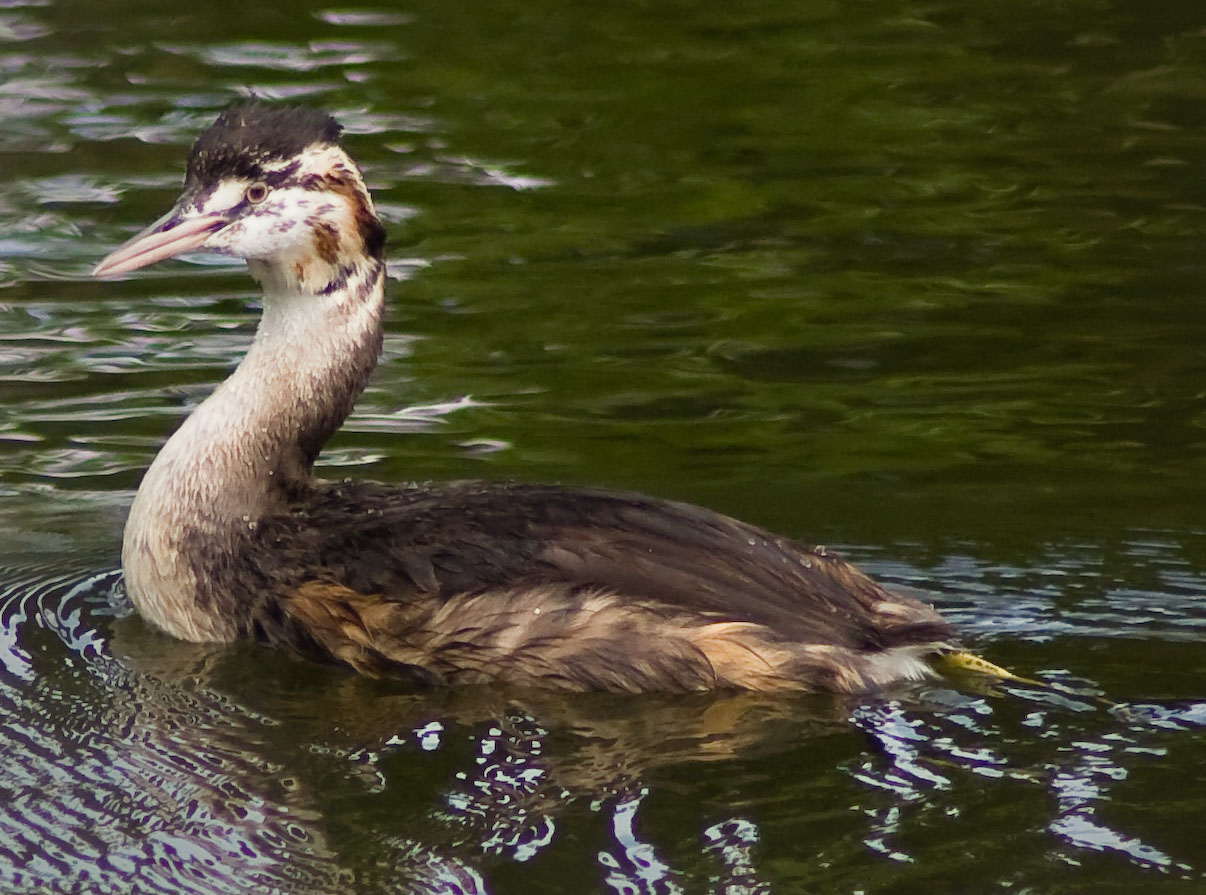
Great crested grebe

Order: Podicipediformes Family: Podicipedidae

Grebes are small to medium-large freshwater diving birds. They have lobed toes and are excellent swimmers and divers. However, they have their feet placed far back on the body, making them quite ungainly on land.

- Little grebe, Tachybaptus ruficollis
- Horned grebe, Podiceps auritus
- Red-necked grebe, Podiceps grisegena
- Great crested grebe, Podiceps cristatus
- Eared grebe, Podiceps nigricollis

== Pigeons and doves ==
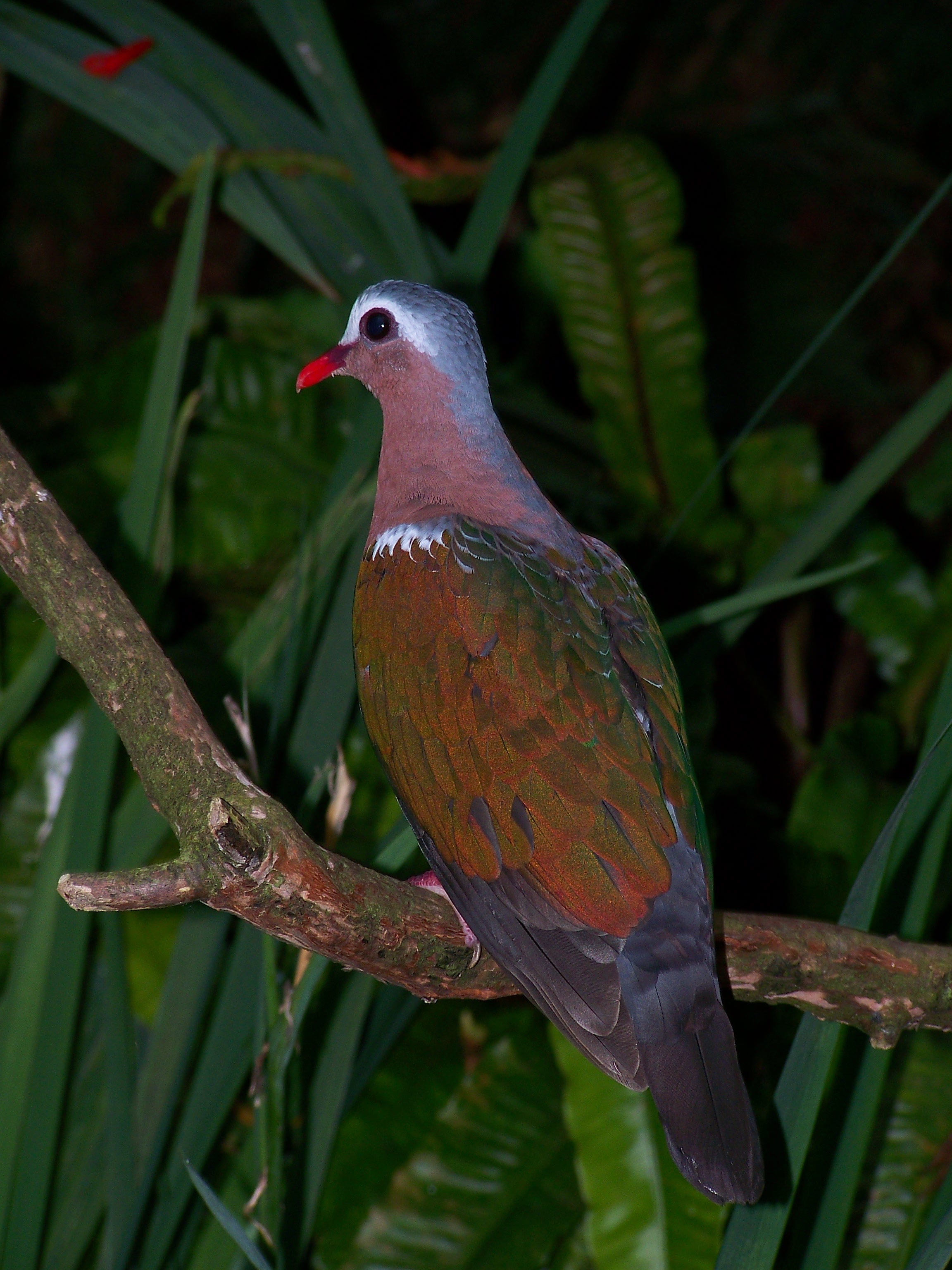
Common emerald dove

Order: Columbiformes Family: Columbidae

Pigeons and doves are stout-bodied birds with short necks and short slender bills with a fleshy cere.

- Rock pigeon, Columba livia
- Hill pigeon, Columba rupestris
- Snow pigeon, Columba leuconota
- Stock dove, Columba oenas (V)
- Yellow-eyed pigeon, Columba eversmanni
- Common wood-pigeon, Columba palumbus
- Speckled wood-pigeon, Columba hodgsonii
- European turtle-dove, Streptopelia turtur
- Oriental turtle-dove, Streptopelia orientalis
- Eurasian collared-dove, Streptopelia decaocto
- Red collared-dove, Streptopelia tranquebarica
- Spotted dove, Spilopelia chinensis
- Laughing dove, Spilopelia senegalensis
- Namaqua dove, Oena capensis (V)
- Asian emerald dove, Chalcophaps indica
- Yellow-footed green-pigeon, Treron phoenicoptera
- Wedge-tailed green-pigeon, Treron sphenurus
- Orange-breasted green-pigeon, Treron bicinctus
- Thick-billed green pigeon, Treron curvirostra

== Sandgrouse ==
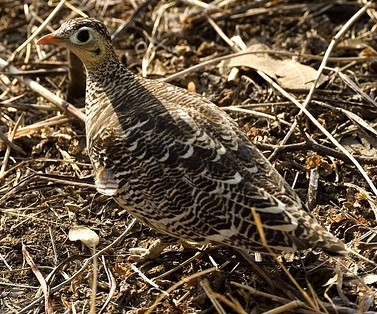
Painted sandgrouse

Order: Pterocliformes Family: Pteroclidae

Sandgrouse have small, pigeon like heads and necks, but sturdy compact bodies. They have long pointed wings and sometimes tails and a fast direct flight. Flocks fly to watering holes at dawn and dusk. Their legs are feathered down to the toes.

- Tibetan sandgrouse, Syrrhaptes tibetanus
- Pin-tailed sandgrouse, Pterocles alchata
- Chestnut-bellied sandgrouse, Pterocles exustus
- Spotted sandgrouse, Pterocles senegallus
- Black-bellied sandgrouse, Pterocles orientalis
- Crowned sandgrouse, Pterocles coronatus
- Lichtenstein's sandgrouse, Pterocles lichtensteinii
- Painted sandgrouse, Pterocles indicus
- Tibetan sandgrouse, Syrrhaptes tibetanus

== Bustards ==
Order: Otidiformes Family: Otididae

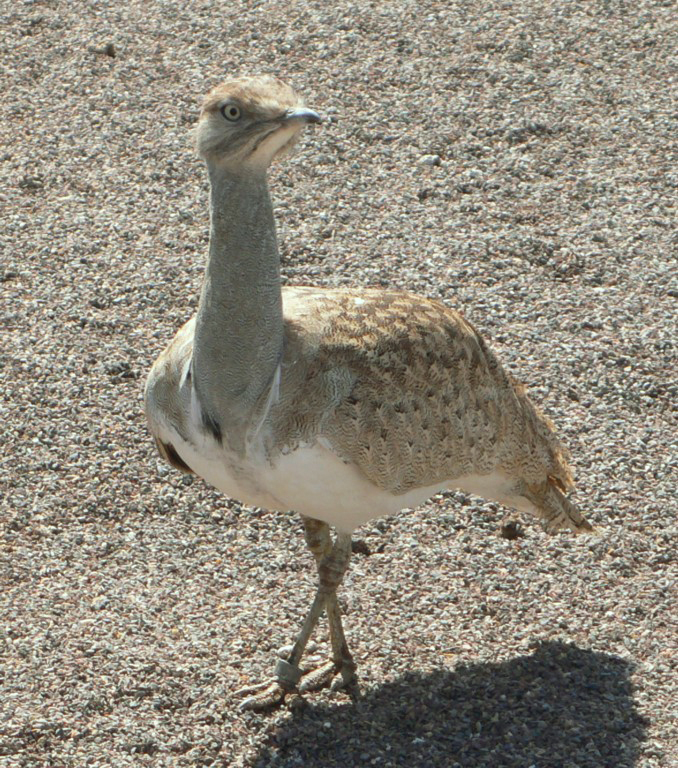
The houbara bustard is the provincial bird of Balochistan.

Bustards are large terrestrial birds mainly associated with dry open country and steppes in the Old World. They are omnivorous and nest on the ground. They walk steadily on strong legs and big toes, pecking for food as they go. They have long broad wings with "fingered" wingtips and striking patterns in flight. Many have interesting mating displays. Their numbers have declined considerably due to hunting.

- Great bustard, Otis tarda
- Great Indian bustard, Ardeotis nigriceps
- MacQueen's bustard, Chlamydotis macqueenii
- Lesser florican, Sypheotides indicus
- Little bustard, Tetrax tetrax

== Cuckoos ==
Order: Cuculiformes Family: Cuculidae

The family Cuculidae includes cuckoos, roadrunners and anis. These birds are of variable size with slender bodies, long tails and strong legs. The Old World cuckoos are brood parasites.

- Greater coucal, Centropus sinensis
- Lesser coucal, Centropus bengalensis (A)
- Sirkeer malkoha, Taccocua leschenaultii
- Pied cuckoo, Clamator jacobinus
- Asian koel, Eudynamys scolopacea
- Plaintive cuckoo, Cacomantis merulinus
- Gray-bellied cuckoo, Cacomantis passerinus
- Large hawk-cuckoo, Hierococcyx sparverioides
- Common hawk-cuckoo, Hierococcyx varius
- Lesser cuckoo, Cuculus poliocephalus
- Indian cuckoo, Cuculus micropterus
- Himalayan cuckoo, Cuculus saturatus
- Common cuckoo, Cuculus canorus
- Oriental cuckoo, Cuculus optatus

== Nightjars and allies ==
Order: Caprimulgiformes Family: Caprimulgidae

Nightjars are medium-sized nocturnal birds that usually nest on the ground. They have long wings, short legs and very short bills. Most have small feet, of little use for walking, and long pointed wings. Their soft plumage is camouflaged to resemble bark or leaves.

- Gray nightjar, Caprimulgus jotaka
- Eurasian nightjar, Caprimulgus europaeus
- Egyptian nightjar, Caprimulgus aegyptius
- Sykes's nightjar, Caprimulgus mahrattensis
- Large-tailed nightjar, Caprimulgus macrurus
- Indian nightjar, Caprimulgus asiaticus
- Savanna nightjar, Caprimulgus affinis

== Swifts ==
Order: Caprimulgiformes Family: Apodidae

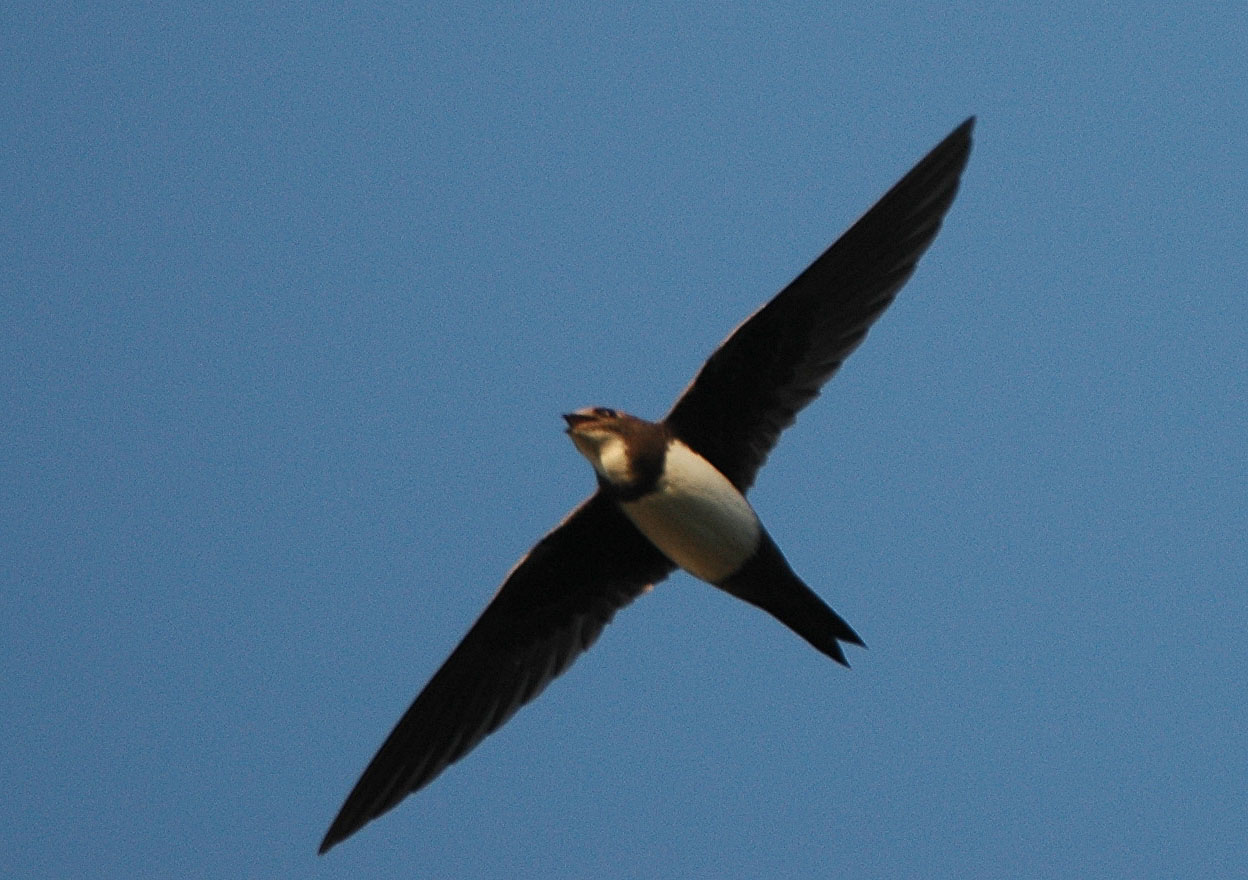
Alpine swift

Swifts are small birds which spend the majority of their lives flying. These birds have very short legs and never settle voluntarily on the ground, perching instead only on vertical surfaces. Many swifts have long swept-back wings which resemble a crescent or boomerang. There are 9 species which have been recorded in Pakistan.

- White-throated needletail, Hirundapus caudacutus
- Himalayan swiftlet, Aerodramus brevirostris
- Alpine swift, Tachymarptis melba
- Common swift, Apus apus
- Pallid swift, Apus pallidus
- Blyth's swift, Apus leuconyx
- Little swift, Apus affinis
- House swift, Apus nipalensis
- Asian palm-swift, Cypsiurus balasiensis

== Rails, gallinules, and coots ==
Order: Gruiformes Family: Rallidae

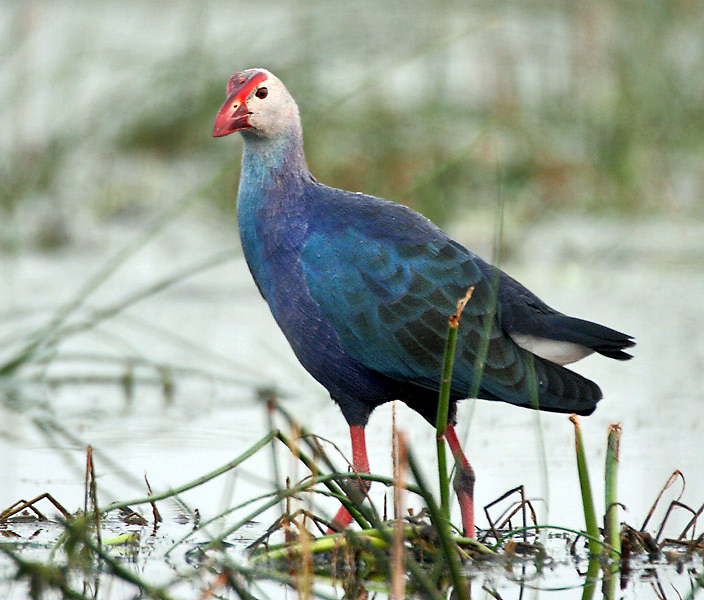
Gray-headed swamphen

Rallidae is a large family of small to medium-sized birds which includes the rails, crakes, coots and gallinules. Typically they inhabit dense vegetation in damp environments near lakes, swamps or rivers. In general they are shy and secretive birds, making them difficult to observe. Most species have strong legs and long toes which are well adapted to soft uneven surfaces. They tend to have short, rounded wings and to be weak fliers.

- Water rail, Rallus aquaticus
- Corn crake, Crex crex (V)
- Slaty-breasted rail, Lewinia striata
- Spotted crake, Porzana porzana
- Eurasian moorhen, Gallinula chloropus
- Eurasian coot, Fulica atra
- Gray-headed swamphen, Porphyrio poliocephalus
- Watercock, Gallicrex cinerea
- White-breasted waterhen, Amaurornis phoenicurus
- Slaty-legged crake, Rallina eurizonoides
- Ruddy-breasted crake, Zapornia fusca
- Brown crake, Zapornia akool
- Little crake, Zapornia parva
- Baillon's crake, Zapornia pusilla

== Cranes ==
Order: Gruiformes Family: Gruidae

Cranes are large, long-legged and long-necked birds. Unlike the similar-looking but unrelated herons, cranes fly with necks outstretched, not pulled back. Most have elaborate and noisy courting displays or "dances". In this country numbers have declined as they are sought after as pet birds and hunted in the North-West in particular. The sarus crane which is found in abundant numbers in India has almost disappeared in Pakistan although a lone pair was sighted in 2011 in the tharparker area after 10 years. This decline is due to hunting.

- Demoiselle crane, Anthropoides virgo
- Siberian crane, Leucogeranus leucogeranus (Ex?)
- Sarus crane, Antigone antigone
- Common crane, Grus grus
- Hooded crane, Grus monacha (V)

== Thick-knees ==
Order: Charadriiformes Family: Burhinidae

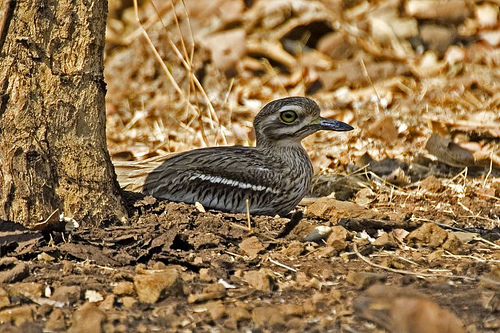
Indian thick-knee

The thick-knees are a group of largely tropical waders in the family Burhinidae. They are found worldwide within the tropical zone, with some species also breeding in temperate Europe and Australia. They are medium to large waders with strong black or yellow-black bills, large yellow eyes and cryptic plumage. Despite being classed as waders, most species have a preference for arid or semi-arid habitats.

- Eurasian thick-knee, Burhinus oedicnemus
- Indian thick-knee, Burhinus indicus
- Great thick-knee, Esacus recurvirostris

== Stilts and avocets ==
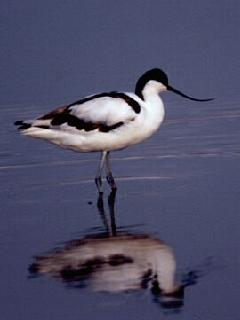
Pied avocet

Order: Charadriiformes Family: Recurvirostridae

Recurvirostridae is a family of large wading birds, which includes the avocets and stilts. The avocets have long legs and long up-curved bills. The stilts have extremely long legs and long, thin, straight bills. There are 2 species which have been recorded in Pakistan.

- Black-winged stilt, Himantopus himantopus
- Pied avocet, Recurvirostra avosetta

== Ibisbill ==
Order: Charadriiformes Family: Ibidorhynchidae

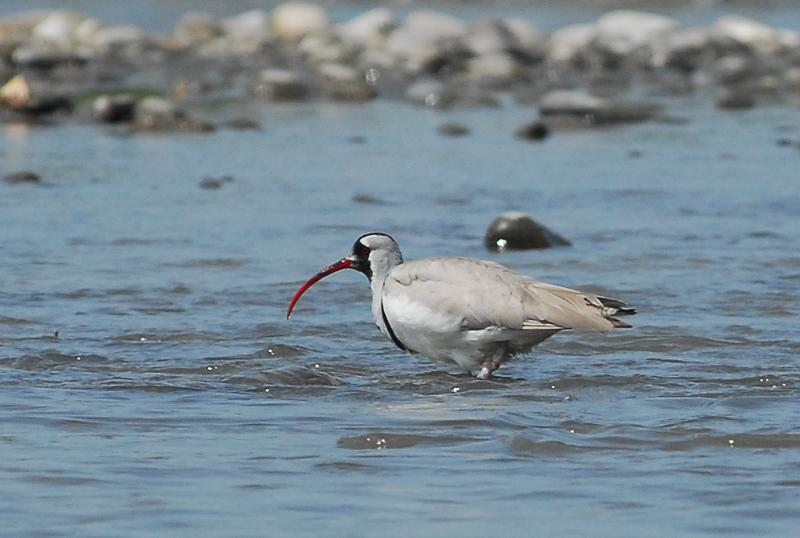
Ibisbill

The ibisbill is related to the waders, but is sufficiently distinctive to be a family unto itself. The adult is grey with a white belly, red legs, a long down curved bill, and a black face and breast band.

- Ibisbill, Ibidorhyncha struthersii

== Oystercatchers ==
Order: Charadriiformes Family: Haematopodidae

The oystercatchers are large and noisy plover-like birds, with strong bills used for smashing or prising open molluscs.

- Eurasian oystercatcher, Haematopus ostralegus

== Plovers and lapwings ==
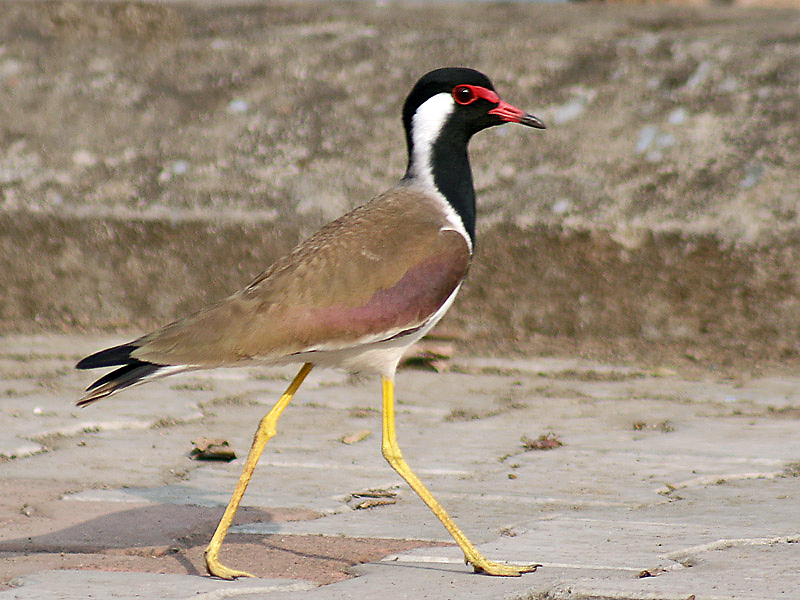
Red-wattled lapwing

Order: Charadriiformes Family: Charadriidae

The family Charadriidae includes the plovers, dotterels and lapwings. They are small to medium-sized birds with compact bodies, short, thick necks and long, usually pointed, wings. They are found in open country worldwide, mostly in habitats near water.

- Black-bellied plover, Pluvialis squatarola
- European golden-plover, Pluvialis apricaria
- Pacific golden-plover, Pluvialis fulva
- Northern lapwing, Vanellus vanellus
- River lapwing, Vanellus duvaucelii (V)
- Yellow-wattled lapwing, Vanellus malabaricus
- Gray-headed lapwing, Vanellus cinereus (V)
- Red-wattled lapwing, Vanellus indicus
- Sociable lapwing, Vanellus gregarius
- White-tailed lapwing, Vanellus leucurus
- Lesser sand-plover, Charadrius mongolus
- Greater sand-plover, Charadrius leschenaultii
- Kentish plover, Charadrius alexandrinus
- Common ringed plover, Charadrius hiaticula
- Little ringed plover, Charadrius dubius

== Painted-snipe ==
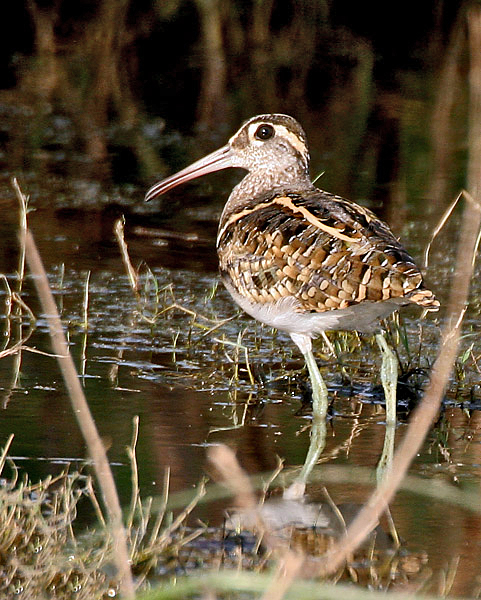
Greater painted-snipe

Order: Charadriiformes Family: Rostratulidae

Painted-snipe are short-legged, long-billed birds similar in shape to the true snipes, but more brightly coloured.

- Greater painted-snipe, Rostratula benghalensis

== Jacanas ==
Order: Charadriiformes Family: Jacanidae

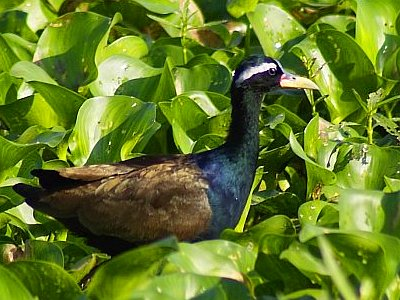
Bronze-winged jacana

The jacanas are a group of tropical waders in the family Jacanidae. They are found throughout the tropics. They are identifiable by their huge feet and claws which enable them to walk on floating vegetation in the shallow lakes that are their preferred habitat.

- Pheasant-tailed jacana, Hydrophasianus chirurgus
- Bronze-winged jacana, Metopidius indicus

== Sandpipers and allies ==
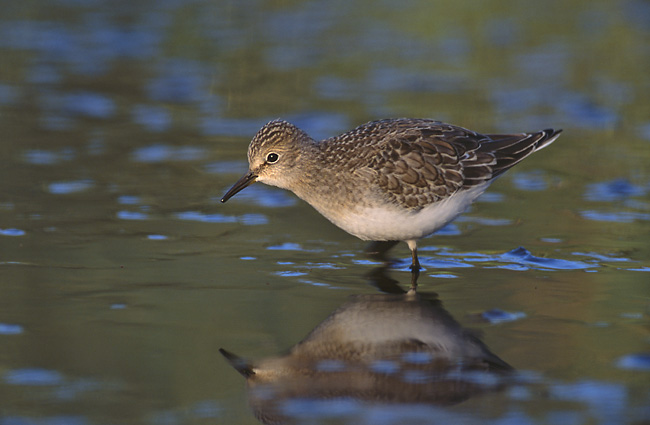
Temminck's stint

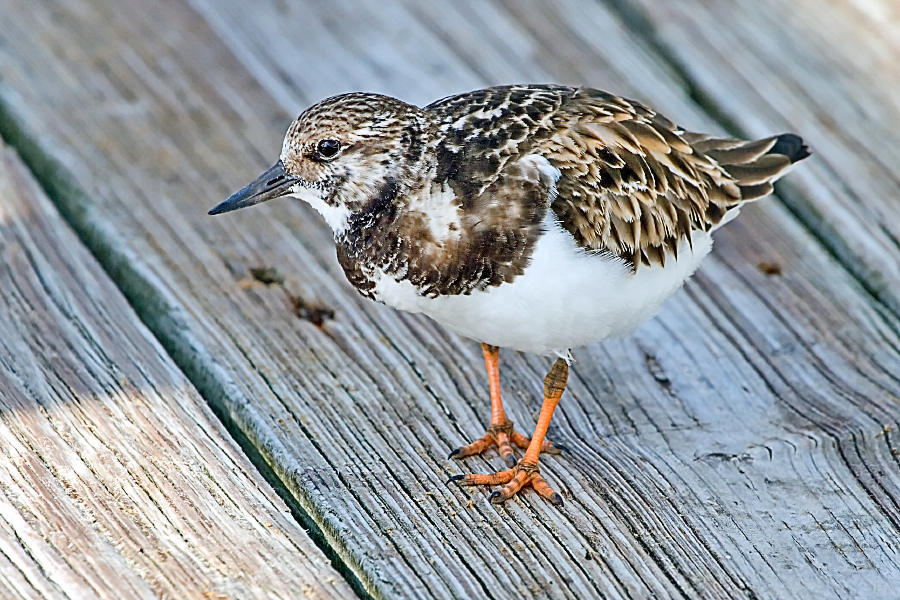
Ruddy turnstone

Order: Charadriiformes Family: Scolopacidae

Scolopacidae is a large diverse family of small to medium-sized shorebirds including the sandpipers, curlews, godwits, shanks, tattlers, woodcocks, snipes, dowitchers and phalaropes. The majority of these species eat small invertebrates picked out of the mud or soil. Variation in length of legs and bills enables multiple species to feed in the same habitat, particularly on the coast, without direct competition for food. There are 30 species which have been recorded in Pakistan.

- Whimbrel, Numenius phaeopus
- Eurasian curlew, Numenius arquata
- Bar-tailed godwit, Limosa lapponica
- Black-tailed godwit, Limosa limosa
- Ruddy turnstone, Arenaria interpres
- Great knot, Calidris tenuirostris
- Red knot, Calidris canutus (V)
- Ruff, Calidris pugnax
- Broad-billed sandpiper, Calidris falcinellus
- Sharp-tailed sandpiper, Calidris acuminata (V)
- Curlew sandpiper, Calidris ferruginea
- Temminck's stint, Calidris temminckii
- Sanderling, Calidris alba
- Dunlin, Calidris alpina
- Little stint, Calidris minuta
- Jack snipe, Lymnocryptes minimus
- Eurasian woodcock, Scolopax rusticola
- Solitary snipe, Gallinago solitaria
- Wood snipe, Gallinago nemoricola
- Common snipe, Gallinago gallinago
- Pin-tailed snipe, Gallinago stenura
- Terek sandpiper, Xenus cinereus
- Red-necked phalarope, Phalaropus lobatus
- Red phalarope, Phalaropus fulicaria (V)
- Common sandpiper, Actitis hypoleucos
- Green sandpiper, Tringa ochropus
- Spotted redshank, Tringa erythropus
- Common greenshank, Tringa nebularia
- Marsh sandpiper, Tringa stagnatilis
- Wood sandpiper, Tringa glareola
- Common redshank, Tringa totanus

== Buttonquail ==
Order: Charadriiformes Family: Turnicidae

The buttonquails are small, drab, running birds which resemble the true quails. The female is the brighter of the sexes and initiates courtship. The male incubates the eggs and tends the young.

- Small buttonquail, Turnix sylvatica
- Yellow-legged buttonquail, Turnix tanki
- Barred buttonquail, Turnix suscitator

== Crab-plover ==
Order: Charadriiformes Family: Dromadidae

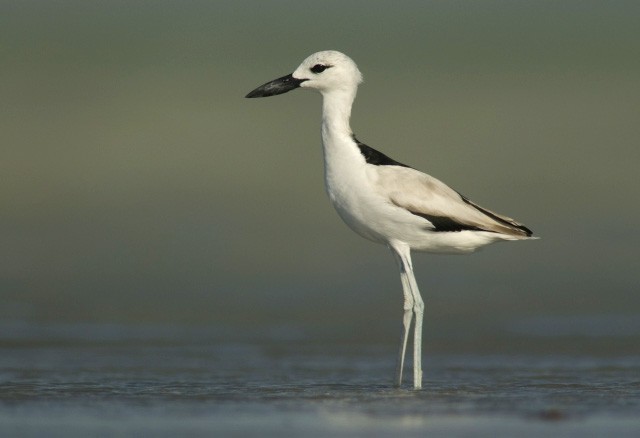
Crab-plover

The crab-plover is related to the waders. It resembles a plover but with very long grey legs and a strong heavy black bill similar to a tern. It has black-and-white plumage, a long neck, partially webbed feet and a bill designed for eating crabs.

- Crab-plover, Dromas ardeola

== Pratincoles and coursers ==
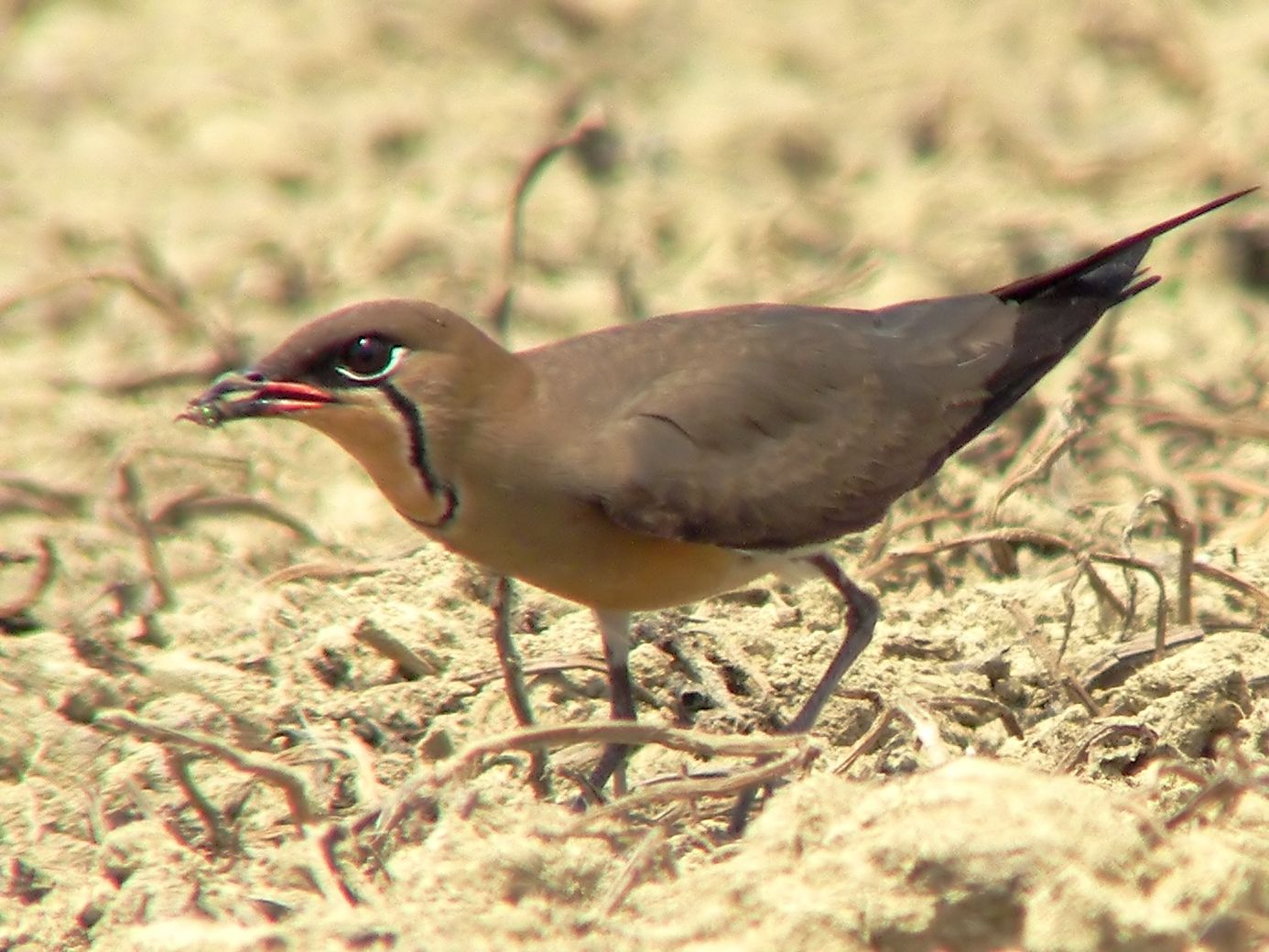
Oriental pratincole

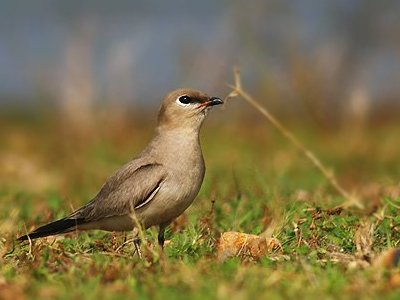
Small pratincole is a resident breeder in Pakistan

Order: Charadriiformes Family: Glareolidae

Glareolidae is a family of wading birds comprising the pratincoles, which have short legs, long pointed wings and long forked tails, and the coursers, which have long legs, short wings and long, pointed bills which curve downwards. There are 5 species which have been recorded in Pakistan.

- Cream-colored courser, Cursorius cursor
- Indian courser, Cursorius coromandelicus
- Collared pratincole, Glareola pratincola
- Oriental pratincole, Glareola maldivarum
- Small pratincole, Glareola lactea

== Skuas and jaegers ==
Order: Charadriiformes Family: Stercorariidae

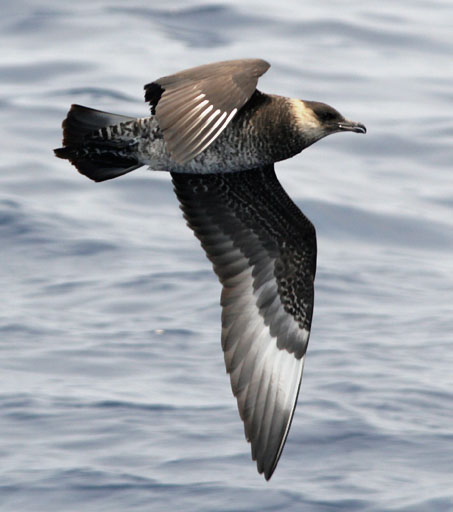
Pomarine jaeger

The family Stercorariidae are, in general, medium to large birds, typically with grey or brown plumage, often with white markings on the wings. They nest on the ground in temperate and arctic regions and are long-distance migrants. There are 2 species which have been recorded in Pakistan.

- Pomarine jaeger, Stercorarius pomarinus
- Parasitic jaeger, Stercorarius parasiticus

== Gulls, terns, and skimmers ==
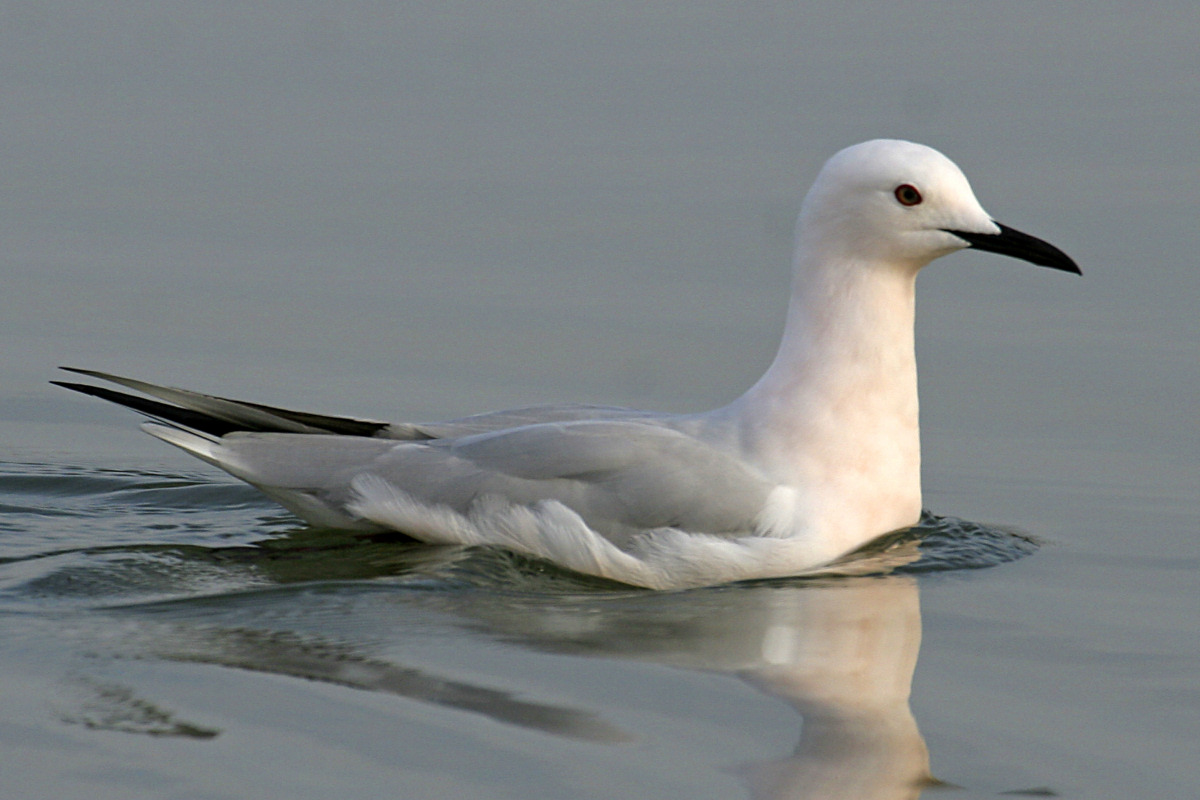
Slender-billed gull breeds on the Pakistan coast

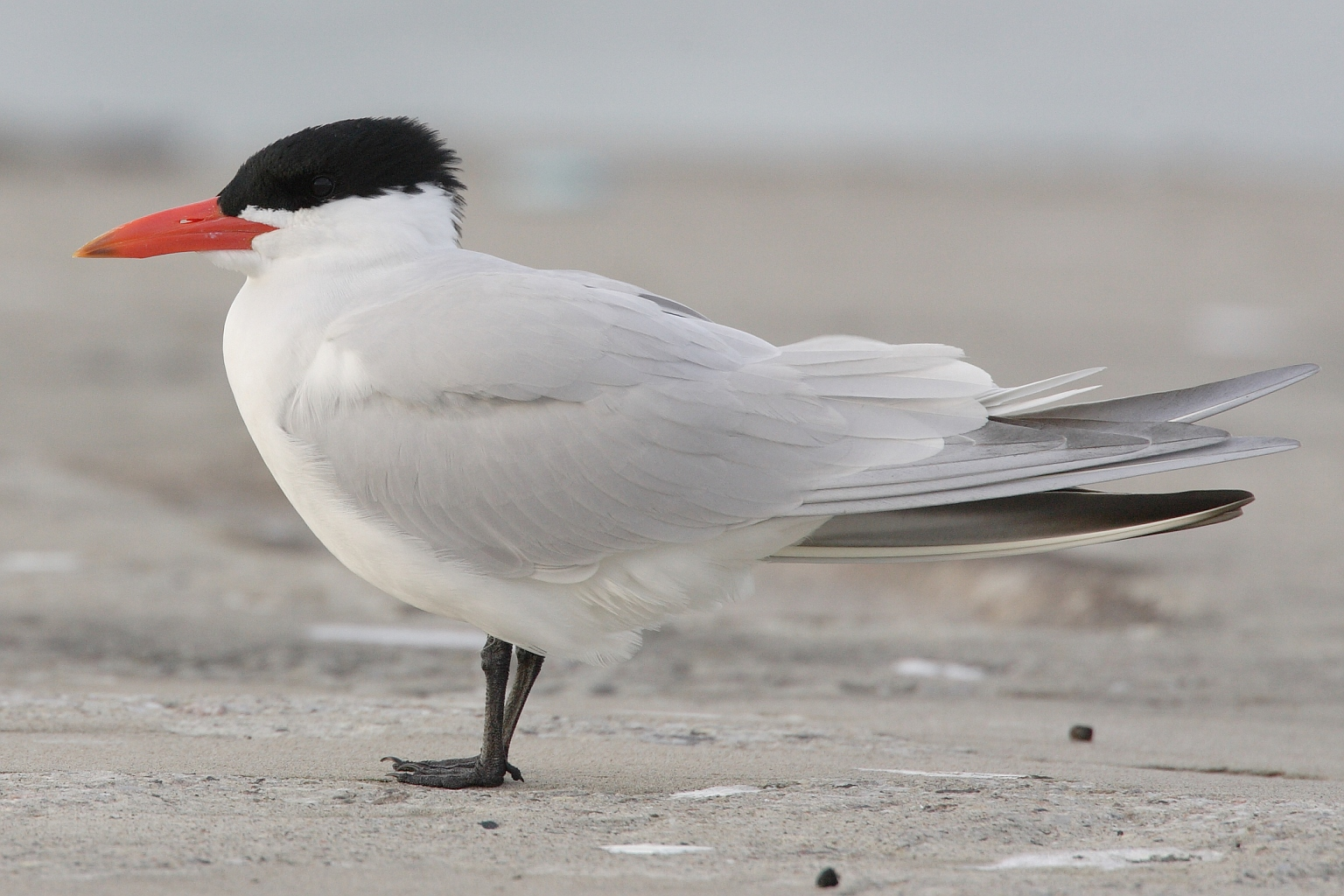
Caspian tern

Order: Charadriiformes Family: Laridae

Laridae is a family of medium to large seabirds, the gulls, terns, and skimmers. Gulls are typically grey or white, often with black markings on the head or wings. They have stout, longish bills and webbed feet. Terns are a group of generally medium to large seabirds typically with grey or white plumage, often with black markings on the head. Most terns hunt fish by diving but some pick insects off the surface of fresh water. Terns are generally long-lived birds, with several species known to live in excess of 30 years. Skimmers are a small family of tropical tern-like birds. They have an elongated lower mandible which they use to feed by flying low over the water surface and skimming the water for small fish.

- Black-legged kittiwake, Rissa tridactyla (V)
- Slender-billed gull, Chroicocephalus genei
- Black-headed gull, Chroicocephalus ridibundus
- Brown-headed gull, Chroicocephalus brunnicephalus
- Little gull, Hydrocoloeus minutus (V)
- Sooty gull, Ichthyaetus hemprichii
- Pallas's gull, Ichthyaetus ichthyaetus
- Common gull, Larus canus
- Herring gull, Larus cachinnans
- Caspian gull, Larus cachinnans
- Lesser black-backed gull, Larus fuscus
- Brown noddy, Anous stolidus
- Bridled tern, Onychoprion anaethetus
- Little tern, Sternula albifrons
- Saunders's tern, Sternula saundersi
- Gull-billed tern, Gelochelidon nilotica
- Caspian tern, Hydroprogne caspia
- White-winged tern, Chlidonias leucopterus
- Whiskered tern, Chlidonias hybrida
- Common tern, Sterna hirundo
- Black-bellied tern, Sterna acuticauda
- River tern, Sterna aurantia
- White-cheeked tern, Sterna repressa
- Great crested tern, Thalasseus bergii
- Sandwich tern, Thalasseus sandvicensis
- Lesser crested tern, Thalasseus bengalensis
- Indian skimmer, Rynchops albicollis

== Tropicbirds ==
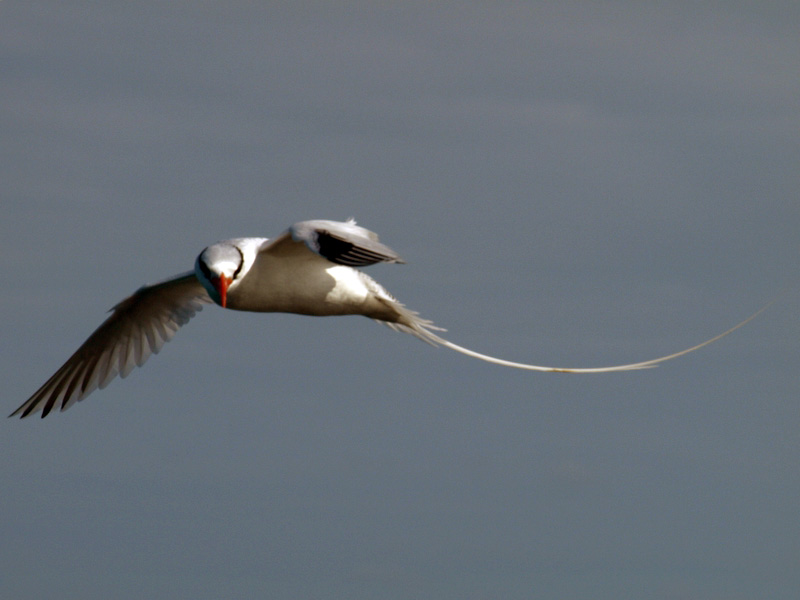
Red-billed tropicbird

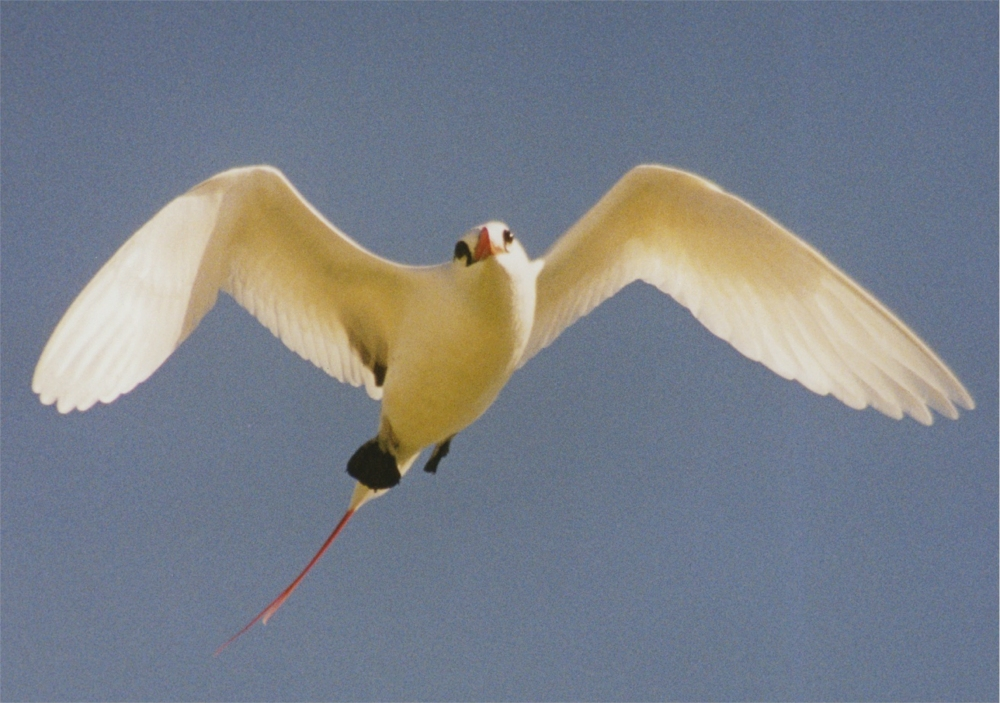
Red-tailed tropicbird in flight

Order: Phaethontiformes Family: Phaethontidae

Tropicbirds are slender white birds of tropical oceans, with exceptionally long central tail feathers. Their heads and long wings have black markings.

- Red-billed tropicbird, Phaethon aethereus
- Red-tailed tropicbird, Phaethon rubricauda

== Loons ==
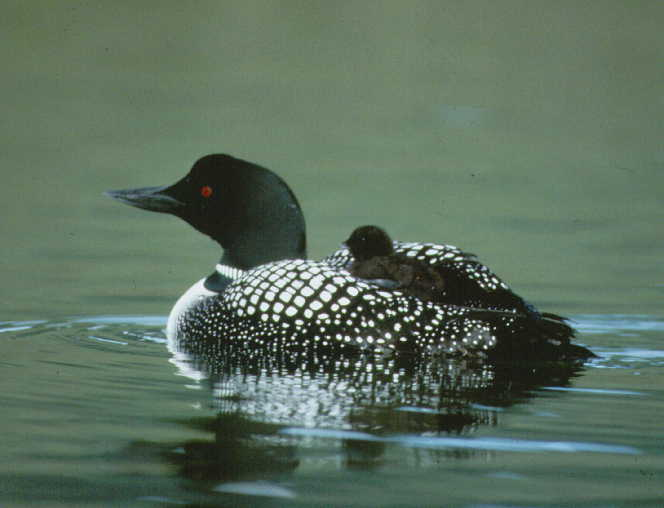
Common loon

Order: Gaviiformes Family: Gaviidae

Loons, The loons are the size of a large duck or small goose, which they somewhat resemble in shape when swimming. There are 2 species which have been recorded in Pakistan.

- Red-throated loon, Gavia stellata
- Common loon, Gavia immer (V)

== Southern storm-petrels ==
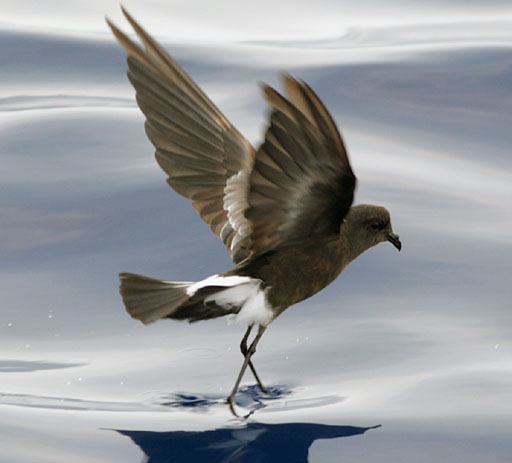
Wilson's storm-petrel

Order: Procellariiformes Family: Oceanitidae

The southern storm-petrels are relatives of the petrels and are the smallest seabirds. They feed on planktonic crustaceans and small fish picked from the surface, typically while hovering. The flight is fluttering and sometimes bat-like.

- Wilson's storm-petrel, Oceanites oceanicus

== Shearwaters and petrels ==
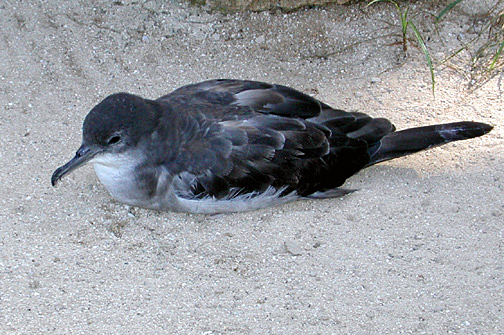
Wedge-tailed shearwater

Order: Procellariiformes Family: Procellariidae

The procellariids are the main group of medium-sized "true petrels", characterised by united nostrils with medium septum and a long outer functional primary.

- Jouanin's petrel, Bulweria fallax (V)
- Flesh-footed shearwater, Ardenna carneipes
- Wedge-tailed shearwater, Ardenna pacificus (V)
- Short-tailed shearwater, Ardenna tenuirostris (V)
- Tropical shearwater, Puffinus bailloni
- Persian shearwater, Puffinus persicus

== Storks ==
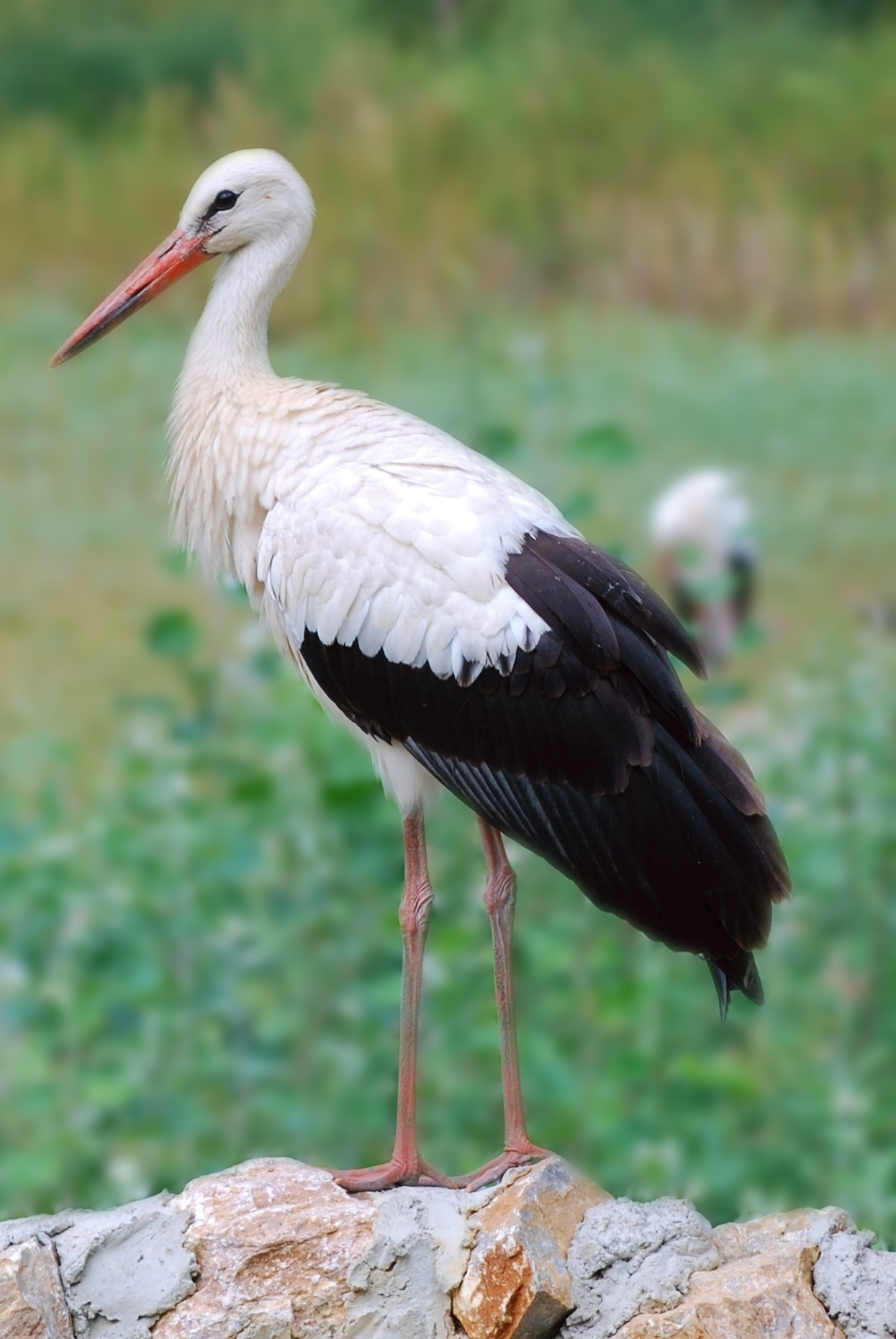
White storks winter in Pakistan

Order: Ciconiiformes Family: Ciconiidae

Storks are large, long-legged, long-necked, wading birds with long, stout bills. Storks are mute, but bill-clattering is an important mode of communication at the nest. Their nests can be large and may be reused for many years. Many species are migratory.

- Asian openbill, Anastomus oscitans
- Black stork, Ciconia nigra
- Asian woolly-necked stork, Ciconia episcopus
- White stork, Ciconia ciconia
- Black-necked stork, Ephippiorhynchus asiaticus
- Greater adjutant, Leptoptilos dubius (V)
- Painted stork, Mycteria leucocephala

== Boobies and gannets ==
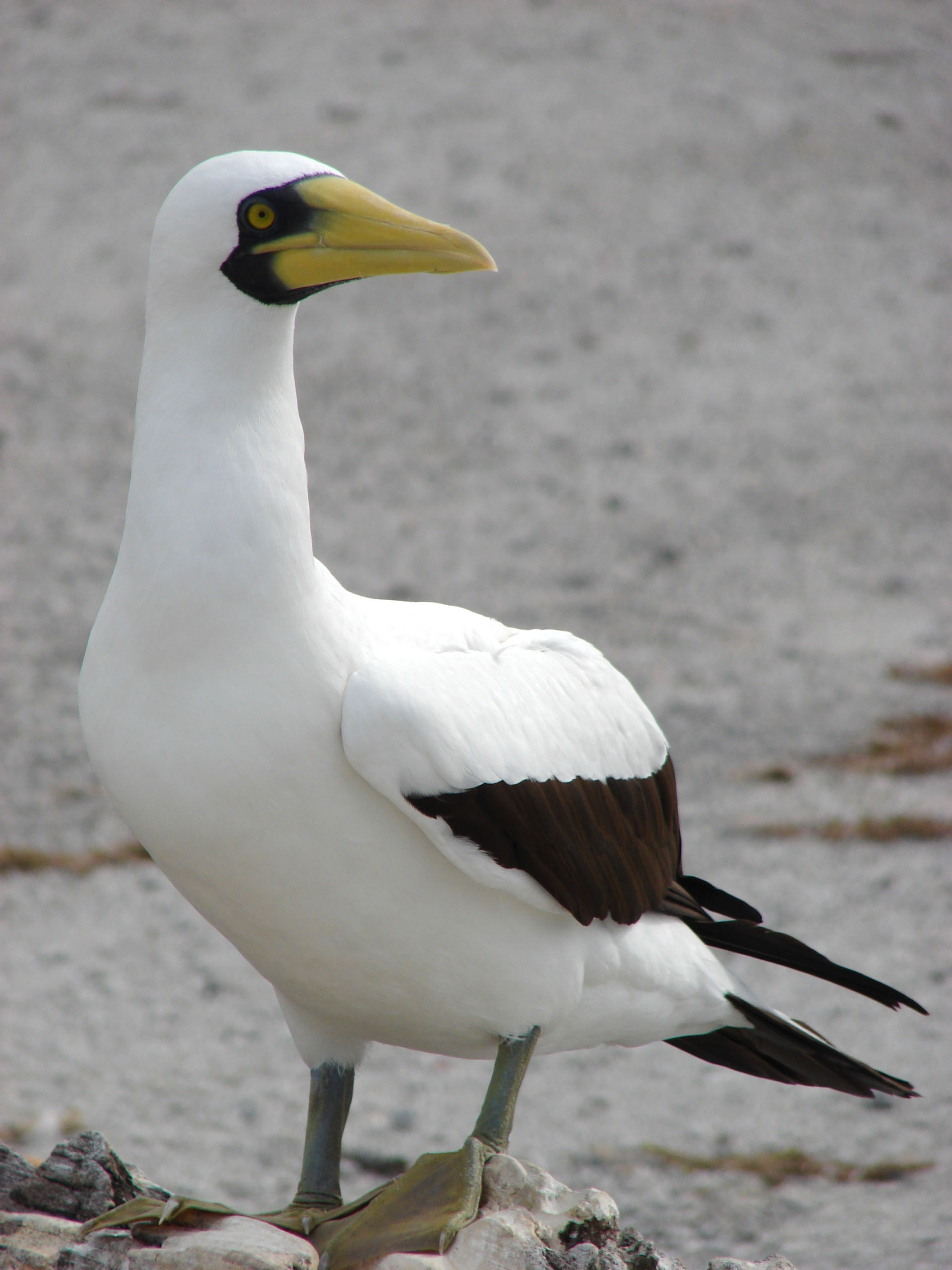
Masked booby

Order: Suliformes Family: Sulidae

The sulids comprise the gannets and boobies. Both groups are medium to large coastal seabirds that plunge-dive for fish.

- Masked booby, Sula dactylatra

== Anhingas ==
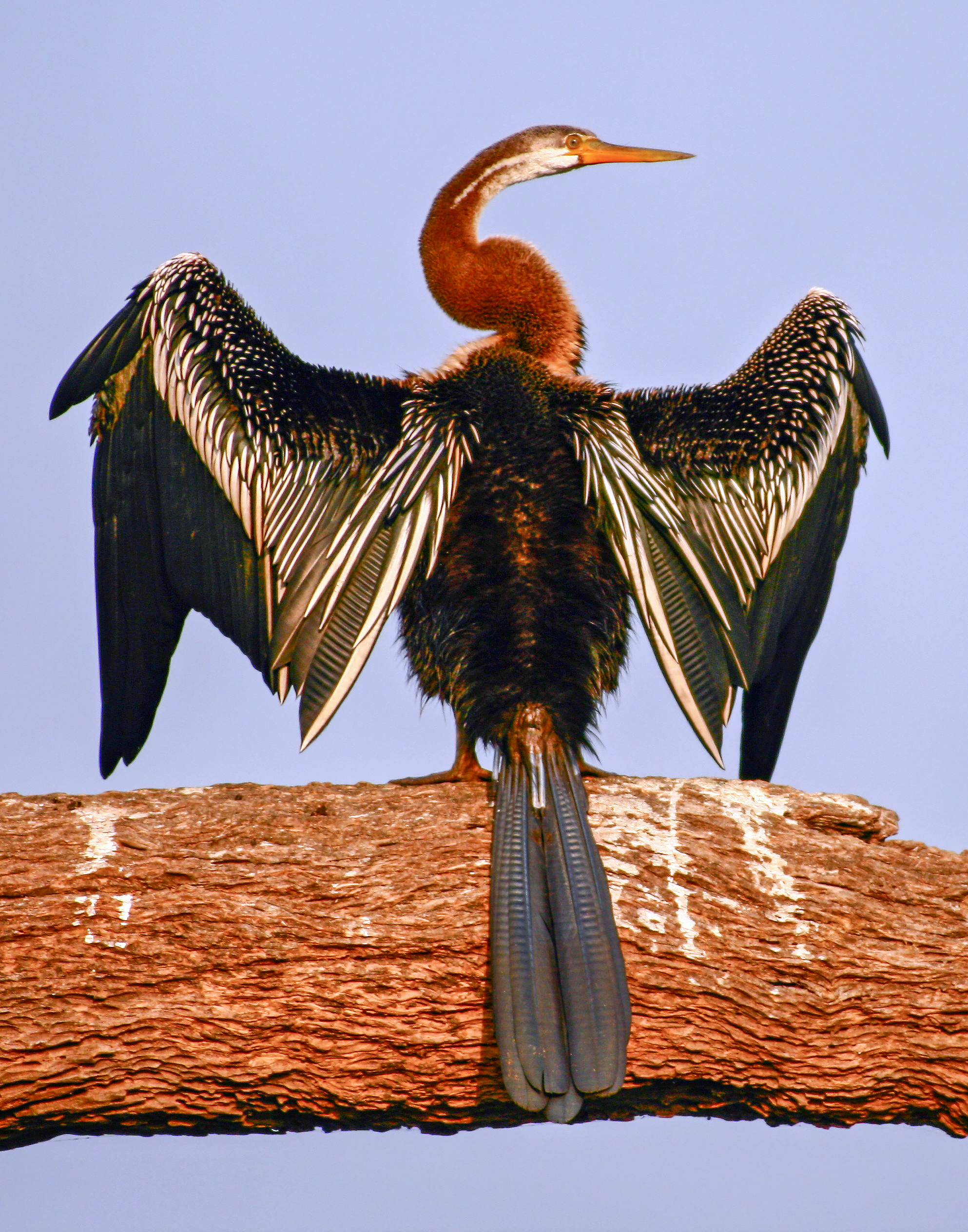
Oriental darter

Order: Suliformes Family: Anhingidae

Darters are often called "snake-birds" because of their long thin neck, which gives a snake-like appearance when they swim with their bodies submerged. The males have black and dark-brown plumage, an erectile crest on the nape and a larger bill than the female. The females have much paler plumage especially on the neck and underparts. The darters have completely webbed feet and their legs are short and set far back on the body. Their plumage is somewhat permeable, like that of cormorants, and they spread their wings to dry after diving.

- Oriental darter, Anhinga melanogaster

== Cormorants and shags ==
Order: Suliformes Family: Phalacrocoracidae

Phalacrocoracidae is a family of medium to large coastal, fish-eating seabirds that includes cormorants and shags. Plumage colouration varies, with the majority having mainly dark plumage, some species being black-and-white and a few being colourful.

- Little cormorant, Microcarbo niger
- Great cormorant, Phalacrocorax carbo
- Indian cormorant, Phalacrocorax fuscicollis
- Pygmy cormorant, Microcarbo pygmeus (V)

== Pelicans ==
Order: Pelecaniformes Family: Pelecanidae

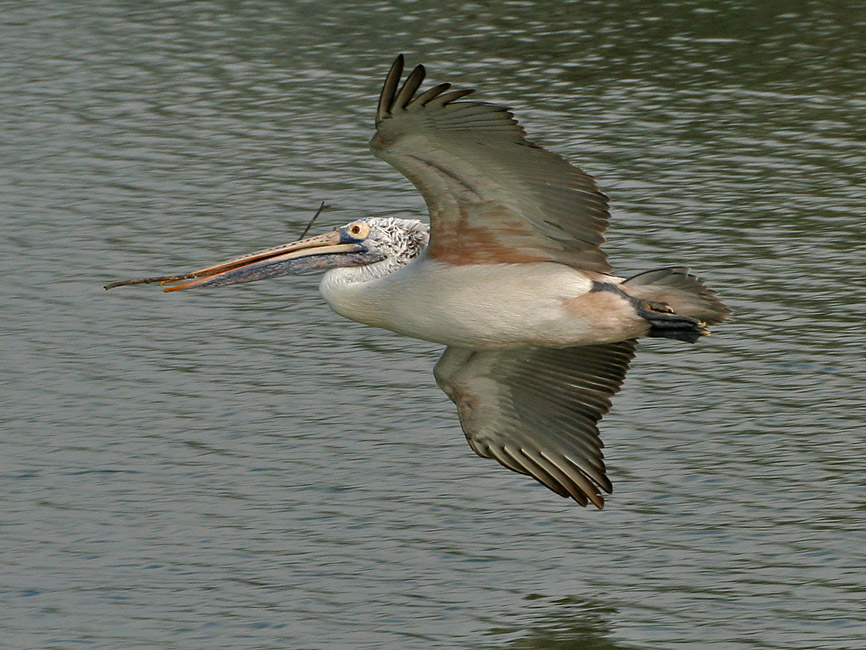
Spot-billed pelican

Pelicans are large water birds with a distinctive pouch under their beak. As with other members of the order Pelecaniformes, they have webbed feet with four toes.

- Great white pelican, Pelecanus onocrotalus
- Spot-billed pelican, Pelecanus philippensis
- Dalmatian pelican, Pelecanus crispus

== Herons, egrets, and bitterns ==
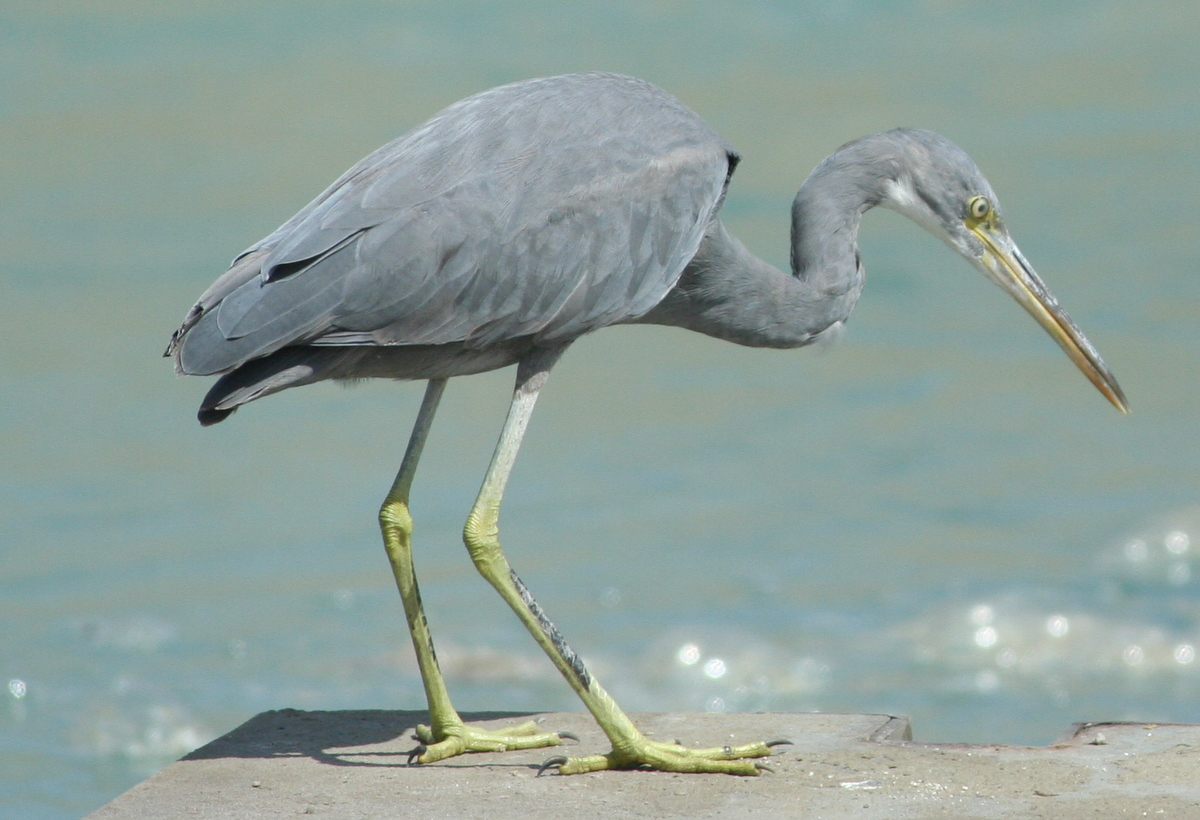
Western reef-heron

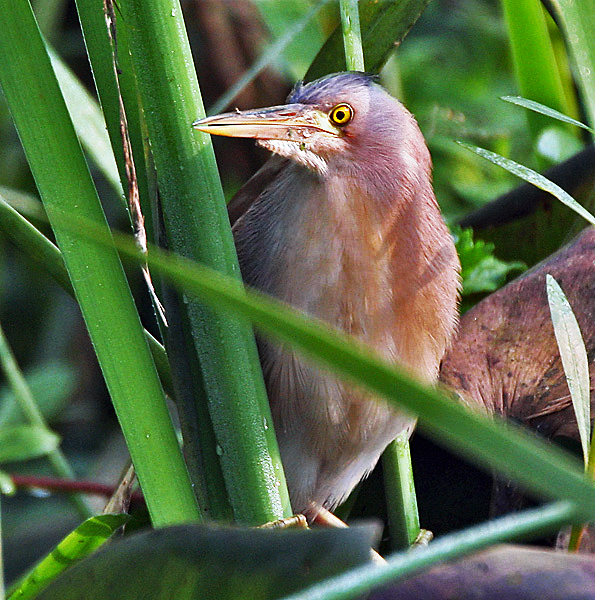
Yellow bittern

Order: Pelecaniformes Family: Ardeidae

The family Ardeidae contains the bitterns, herons and egrets. Herons and egrets are medium to large wading birds with long necks and legs. Bitterns tend to be shorter necked and more wary. Members of Ardeidae fly with their necks retracted, unlike other long-necked birds such as storks, ibises and spoonbills.

- Great bittern, Botaurus stellaris
- Yellow bittern, Ixobrychus sinensis
- Little bittern, Ixobrychus minutus
- Cinnamon bittern, Ixobrychus cinnamomeus
- Black bittern, Ixobrychus flavicollis
- Gray heron, Ardea cinerea
- Goliath heron, Ardea goliath (V)
- Purple heron, Ardea purpurea
- Great egret, Ardea alba
- Intermediate egret, Ardea intermedia
- Little egret, Egretta garzetta
- Western reef-heron, Egretta gularis
- Cattle egret, Bubulcus ibis
- Squacco heron, Ardeola ralloides (V)
- Indian pond-heron, Ardeola grayii
- Chinese pond-heron, Ardeola bacchus (V)
- Striated heron, Butorides striata
- Black-crowned night-heron, Nycticorax nycticorax

== Ibises and spoonbills ==
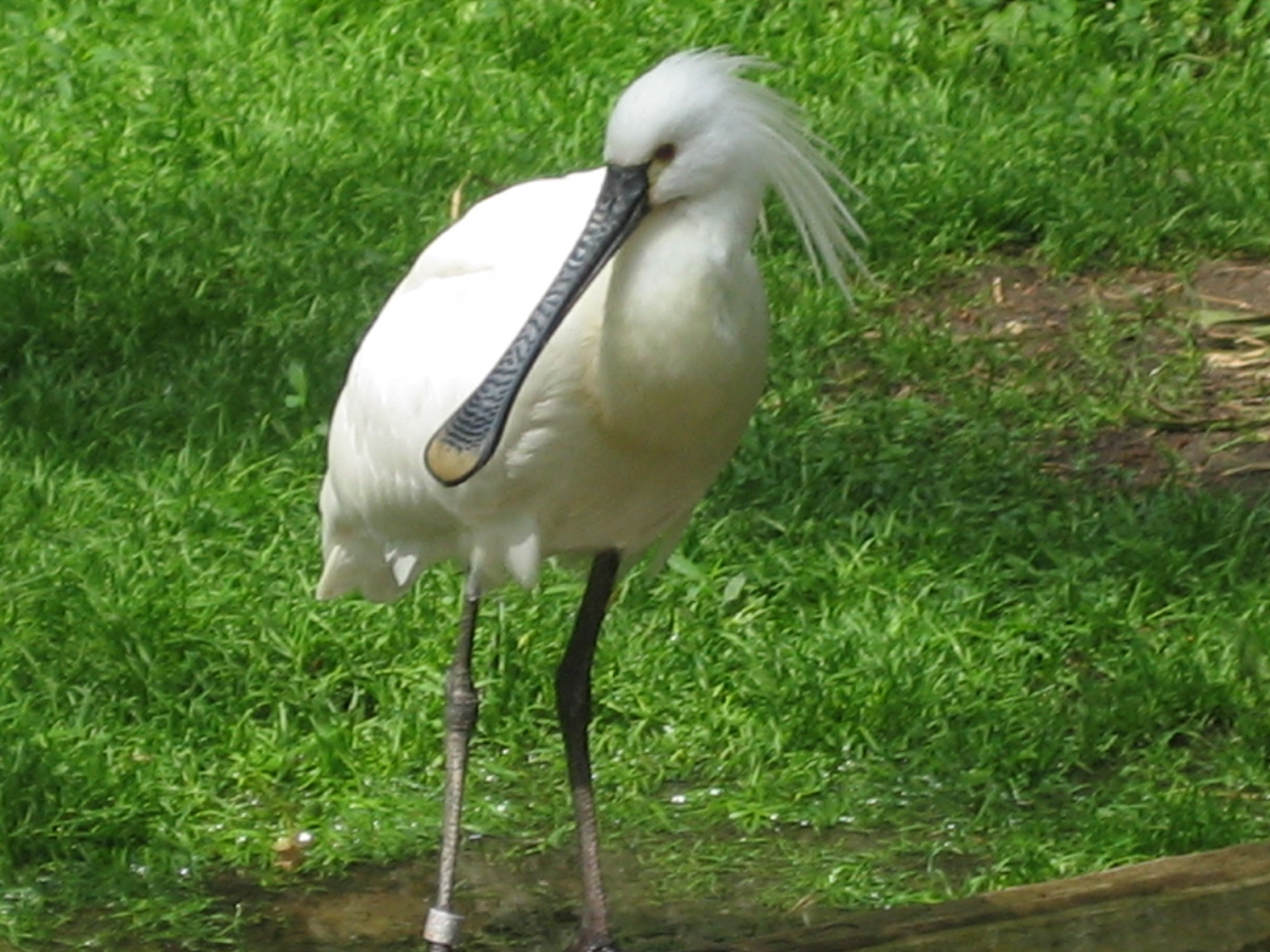
Eurasian spoonbill

Order: Pelecaniformes Family: Threskiornithidae

Threskiornithidae is a family of large terrestrial and wading birds which includes the ibises and spoonbills. They have long, broad wings with 11 primary and about 20 secondary feathers. They are strong fliers and despite their size and weight, very capable soarers.

- Glossy ibis, Plegadis falcinellus
- Black-headed ibis, Threskiornis melanocephalus
- Red-naped ibis, Pseudibis papillosa
- Eurasian spoonbill, Platalea leucorodia

== Osprey ==
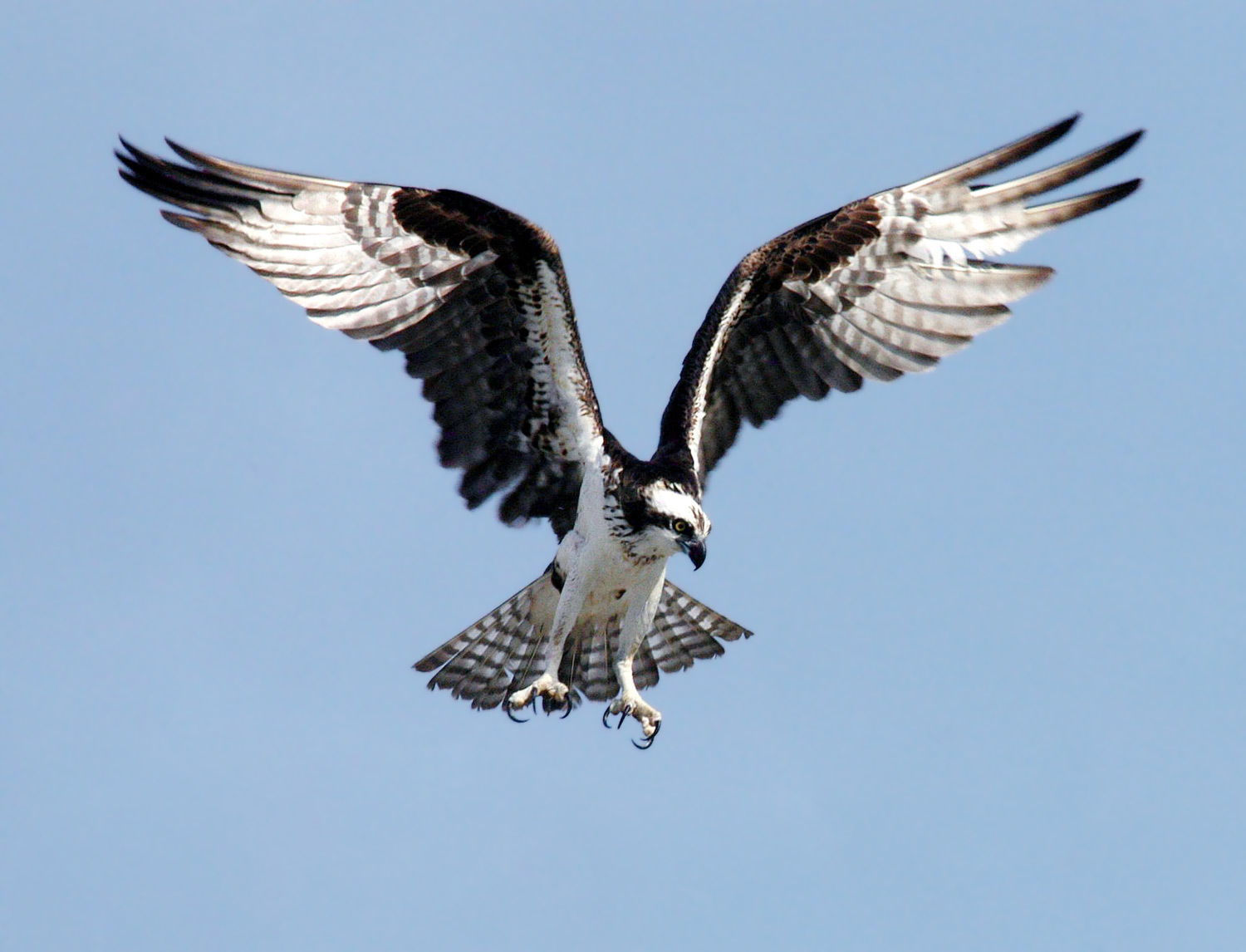
Osprey

Order: Accipitriformes Family: Pandionidae

The family Pandionidae contains only one species, the osprey. The osprey is a medium-large raptor which is a specialist fish-eater with a worldwide distribution.

- Osprey, Pandion haliaetus

== Hawks, eagles, and kites ==
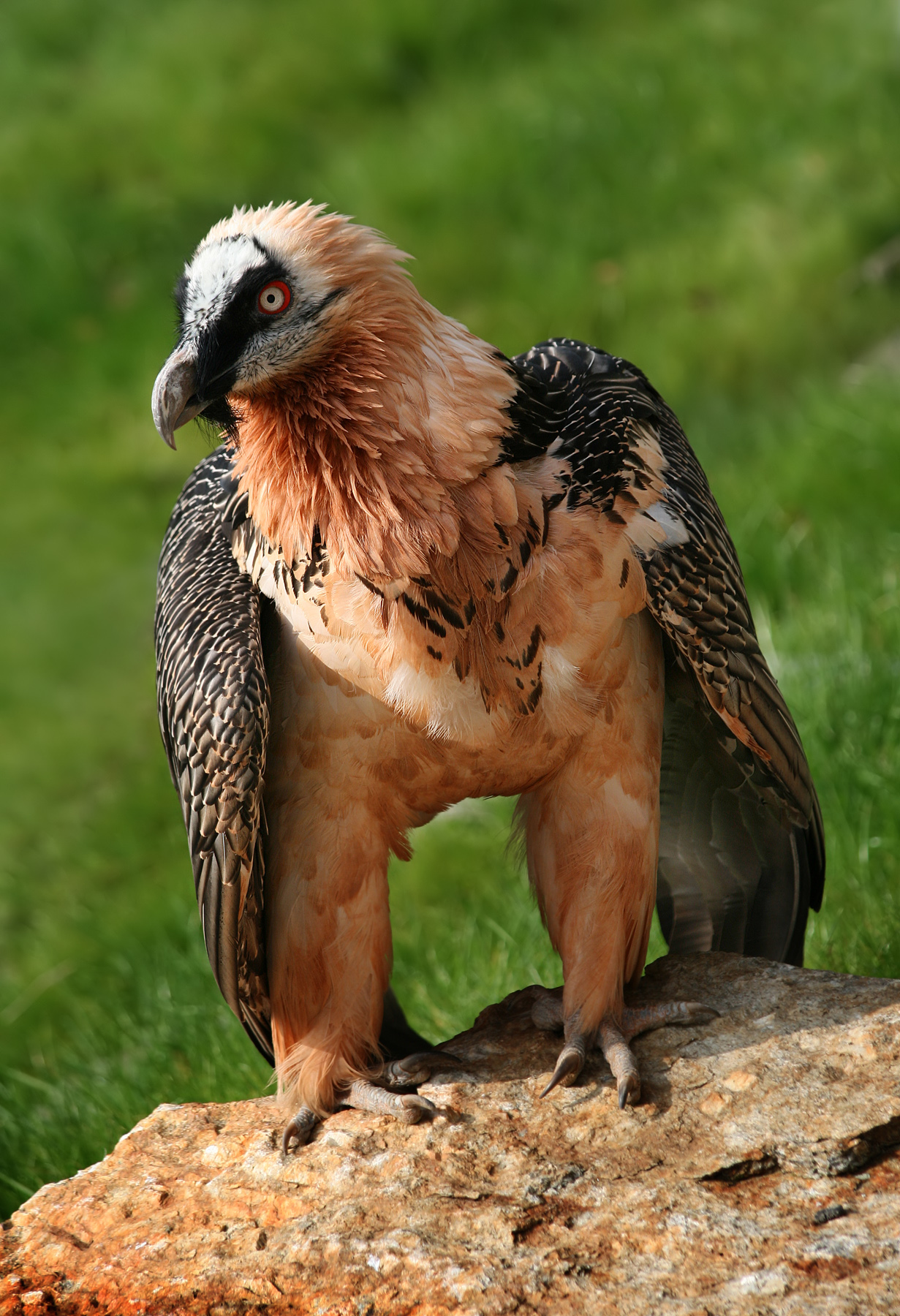
The bearded vulture is found in the mountainous parts

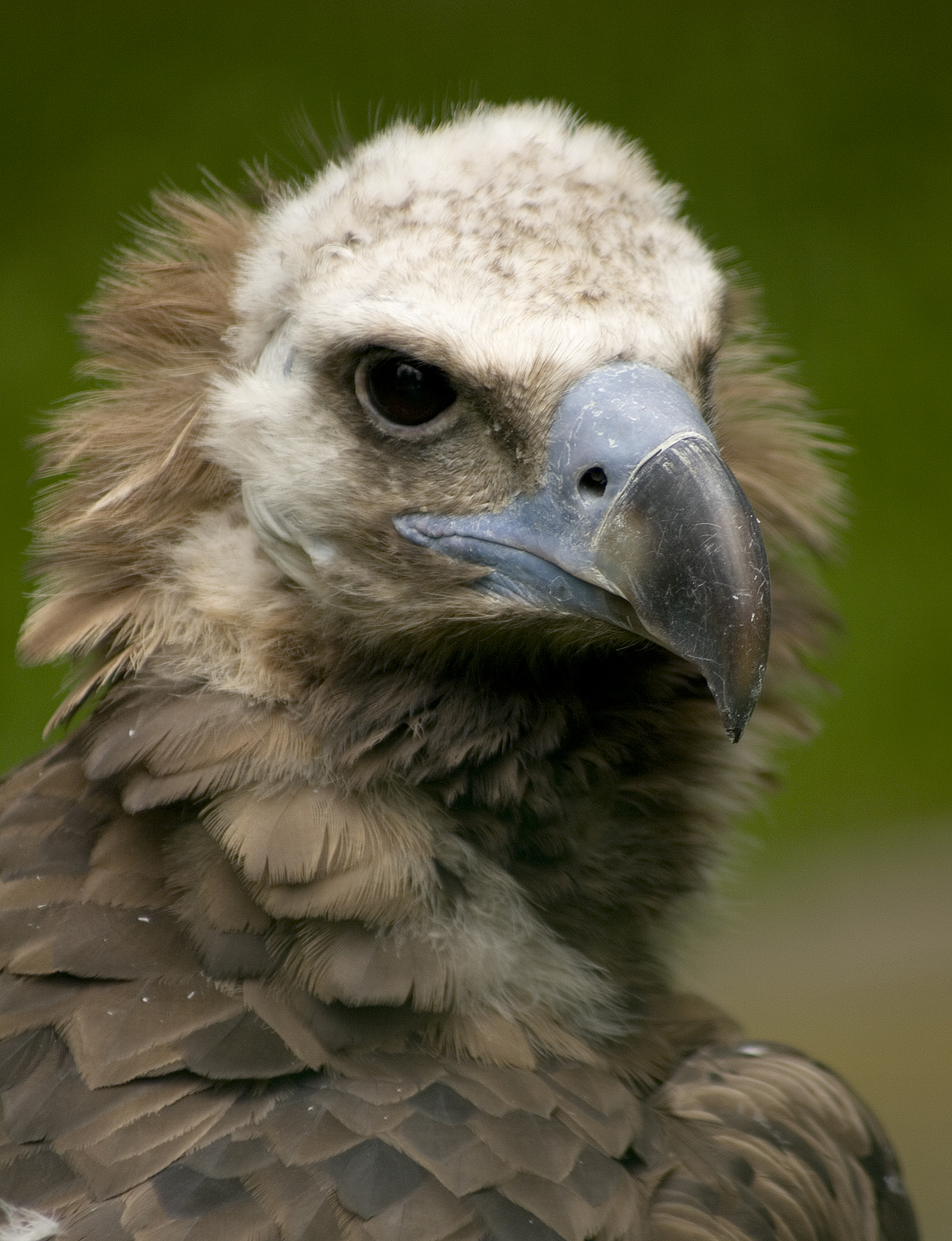
Cinereous vulture

Order: Accipitriformes Family: Accipitridae

Accipitridae is a family of birds of prey, which includes hawks, eagles, kites, harriers and Old World vultures. These birds have powerful hooked beaks for tearing flesh from their prey, strong legs, powerful talons and keen eyesight.

- Black-winged kite, Elanus caeruleus
- Bearded vulture, Gypaetus barbatus
- Egyptian vulture, Neophron percnopterus
- European honey buzzard, Pernis apivorus
- Oriental honey-buzzard, Pernis ptilorhynchus
- Red-headed vulture, Sarcogyps calvus
- Cinereous vulture, Aegypius monachus
- White-rumped vulture, Gyps bengalensis
- Indian vulture, Gyps indicus
- Slender-billed vulture, Gyps tenuirostris
- Himalayan griffon, Gyps himalayensis
- Eurasian griffon, Gyps fulvus
- Crested serpent-eagle, Spilornis cheela
- Short-toed snake-eagle, Circaetus gallicus
- Mountain hawk-eagle, Nisaetus nipalensis
- Black eagle, Ictinaetus malaiensis
- Lesser spotted eagle, Clanga pomarina
- Indian spotted eagle, Clanga hastata
- Greater spotted eagle, Clanga clanga
- Booted eagle, Hieraaetus pennatus
- Tawny eagle, Aquila rapax
- Steppe eagle, Aquila nipalensis
- Imperial eagle, Aquila heliaca
- Golden eagle, Aquila chrysaetos
- Bonelli's eagle, Aquila fasciata
- White-eyed buzzard, Butastur teesa
- Eurasian marsh-harrier, Circus aeruginosus
- Hen harrier, Circus cyaneus
- Pallid harrier, Circus macrourus
- Pied harrier, Circus melanoleucos
- Montagu's harrier, Circus pygargus
- Shikra, Accipiter badius
- Besra, Accipiter virgatus
- Eurasian sparrowhawk, Accipiter nisus
- Northern goshawk, Accipiter gentilis
- Black kite, Milvus migrans
- Brahminy kite, Haliastur indus
- White-tailed eagle, Haliaeetus albicilla
- Pallas's fish eagle, Haliaeetus leucoryphus
- White-bellied sea-eagle, Haliaeetus leucogaster
- Common buzzard, Buteo buteo
- Himalayan buzzard, Buteo burmanicus
- Eastern buzzard, Buteo japonicus
- Long-legged buzzard, Buteo rufinus
- Upland buzzard, Buteo hemilasius

== Barn owls ==
Order: Strigiformes Family: Tytonidae

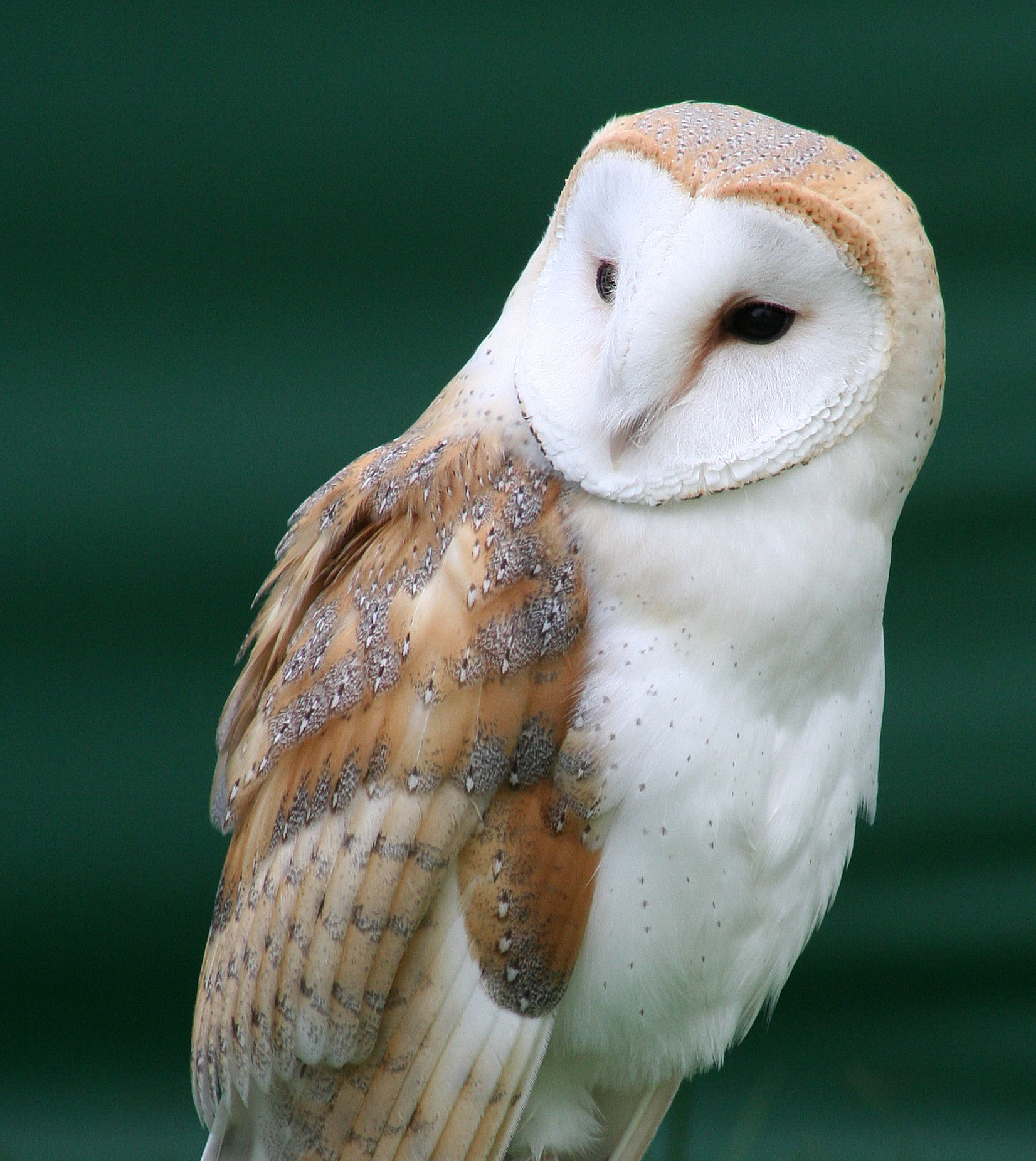
adult Barn owl

Barn-owls are medium to large owls with large heads and characteristic heart-shaped faces. They have long strong legs with powerful talons.

- Eastern barn owl, Tyto javanica

== Owls ==
Order: Strigiformes Family: Strigidae

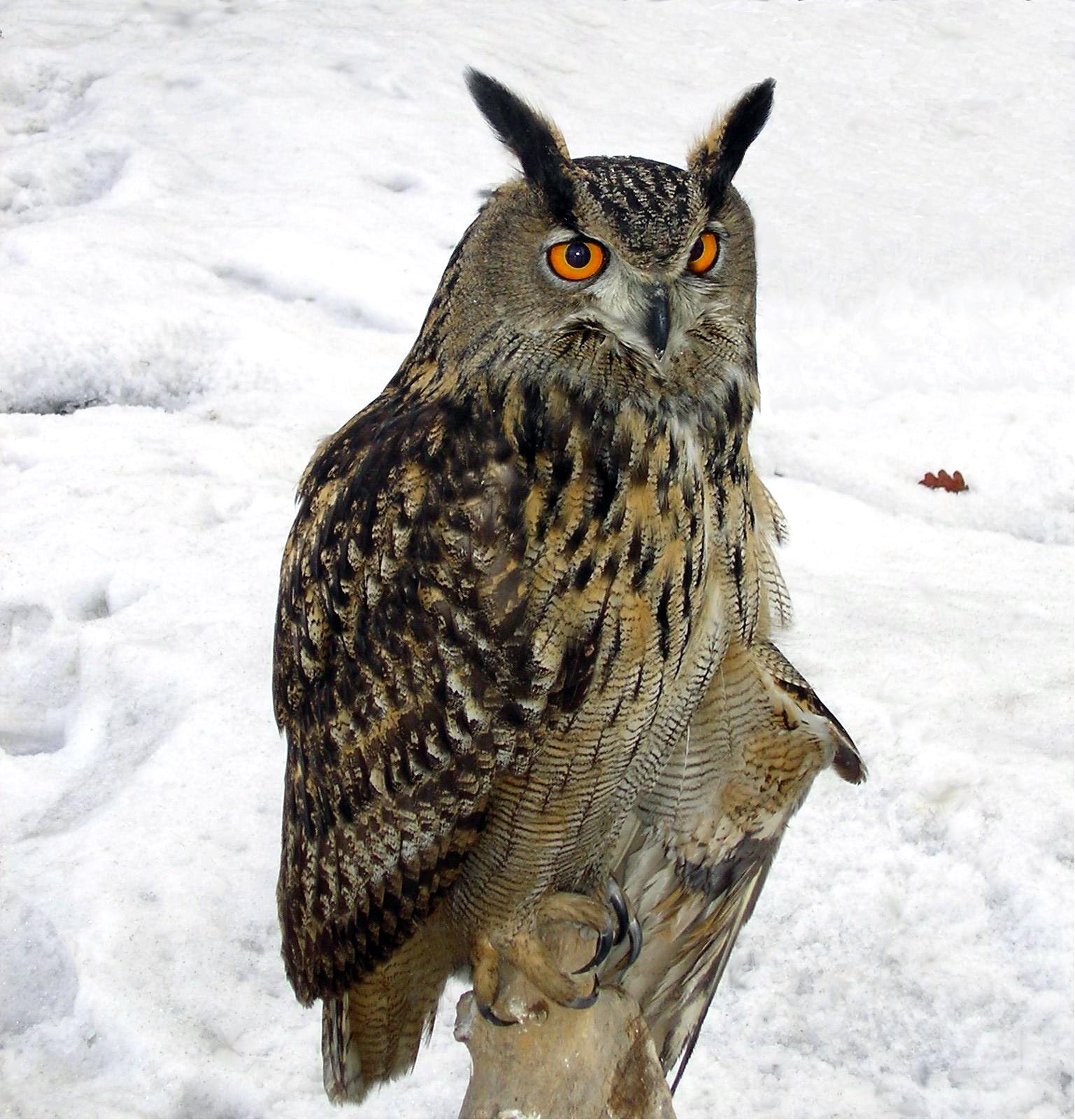
Eurasian eagle-owl

The typical owls are small to large solitary nocturnal birds of prey. They have large forward-facing eyes and ears, a hawk-like beak and a conspicuous circle of feathers around each eye called a facial disk.

- Mountain scops-owl, Otus spilocephalus
- Indian scops-owl, Otus bakkamoena
- Collared scops-owl, Otus lettia
- Eurasian scops-owl, Otus scops
- Pallid scops-owl, Otus brucei
- Oriental scops-owl, Otus sunia
- Eurasian eagle-owl, Bubo bubo
- Rock eagle-owl, Bubo bengalensis
- Dusky eagle-owl, Bubo coromandus
- Snowy owl, Bubo scandiacus (V)
- Brown fish-owl, Ketupa zeylonensis
- Collared owlet, Taenioptynx brodiei
- Asian barred owlet, Glaucidium cuculoides
- Spotted owlet, Athene brama
- Little owl, Athene noctua
- Mottled wood-owl, Strix ocellata
- Brown wood-owl, Strix leptogrammica
- Tawny owl, Strix aluco
- Himalayan owl, Strix nivicolum
- Desert owl, Strix hadorami
- Long-eared owl, Asio otus
- Short-eared owl, Asio flammeus
- Brown boobook, Ninox scutulata
- Boreal owl, Aegolius funereus

== Hoopoes ==
Order: Bucerotiformes Family: Upupidae

Hoopoes have black, white and orangey-pink colouring with a large erectile crest on their head.

- Eurasian hoopoe, Upupa epops

== Hornbills ==
Order: Bucerotiformes Family: Bucerotidae

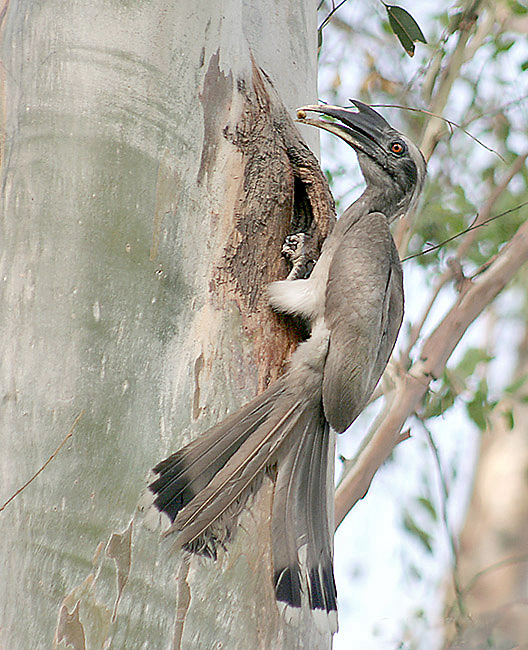
Indian gray hornbill

Hornbills are a group of birds whose bill is shaped like a cow's horn, but without a twist, sometimes with a casque on the upper mandible. Frequently, the bill is brightly coloured.

- Indian gray hornbill, Ocyceros birostris
- Oriental pied hornbill, Anthracoceros albirostris

== Kingfishers ==
Order: Coraciiformes Family: Alcedinidae

Kingfishers are medium-sized birds with large heads, long, pointed bills, short legs and stubby tails.

- Common kingfisher, Alcedo atthis
- White-throated kingfisher, Halcyon smyrnensis
- Black-capped kingfisher, Halcyon pileata (V)
- Crested kingfisher, Megaceryle lugubris
- Pied kingfisher, Ceryle rudis

== Bee-eaters ==
Order: Coraciiformes Family: Meropidae

European bee-eater

The bee-eaters are a group of near passerine birds in the family Meropidae. Most species are found in Africa but others occur in southern Europe, Madagascar, Australia and New Guinea. They are characterised by richly coloured plumage, slender bodies and usually elongated central tail feathers. All are colourful and have long downturned bills and pointed wings, which give them a swallow-like appearance when seen from afar.

- Asian green bee-eater, Merops orientalis
- Blue-cheeked bee-eater, Merops persicus
- Blue-tailed bee-eater, Merops philippinus
- European bee-eater, Merops apiaster

== Broadbills ==
Order: Passeriformes Family:Eurylaimidae

Many of the species are brightly coloured birds that present broad heads, large eyes and a hooked, flat and broad beak. They range from 13 to 28 centimetres in length, and live in the dense canopies of wet forests, allowing them to hide despite their brightly coloured plumage. In Pakistan only one species has been recorded as a vagrant.

- Long-tailed broadbill, Psarisomus dalhousiae (V)

== Rollers ==
Order: Coraciiformes Family: Coraciidae

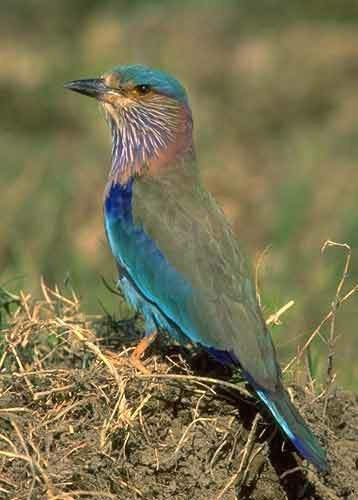
Indian roller

Rollers resemble crows in size and build, but are more closely related to the kingfishers and bee-eaters. They share the colourful appearance of those groups with blues and browns predominating. The two inner front toes are connected, but the outer toe is not.

- European roller, Coracias garrulus
- Indian roller, Coracias benghalensis
- Dollarbird, Eurystomus orientalis

== Asian barbets ==
Order: Piciformes Family: Megalaimidae

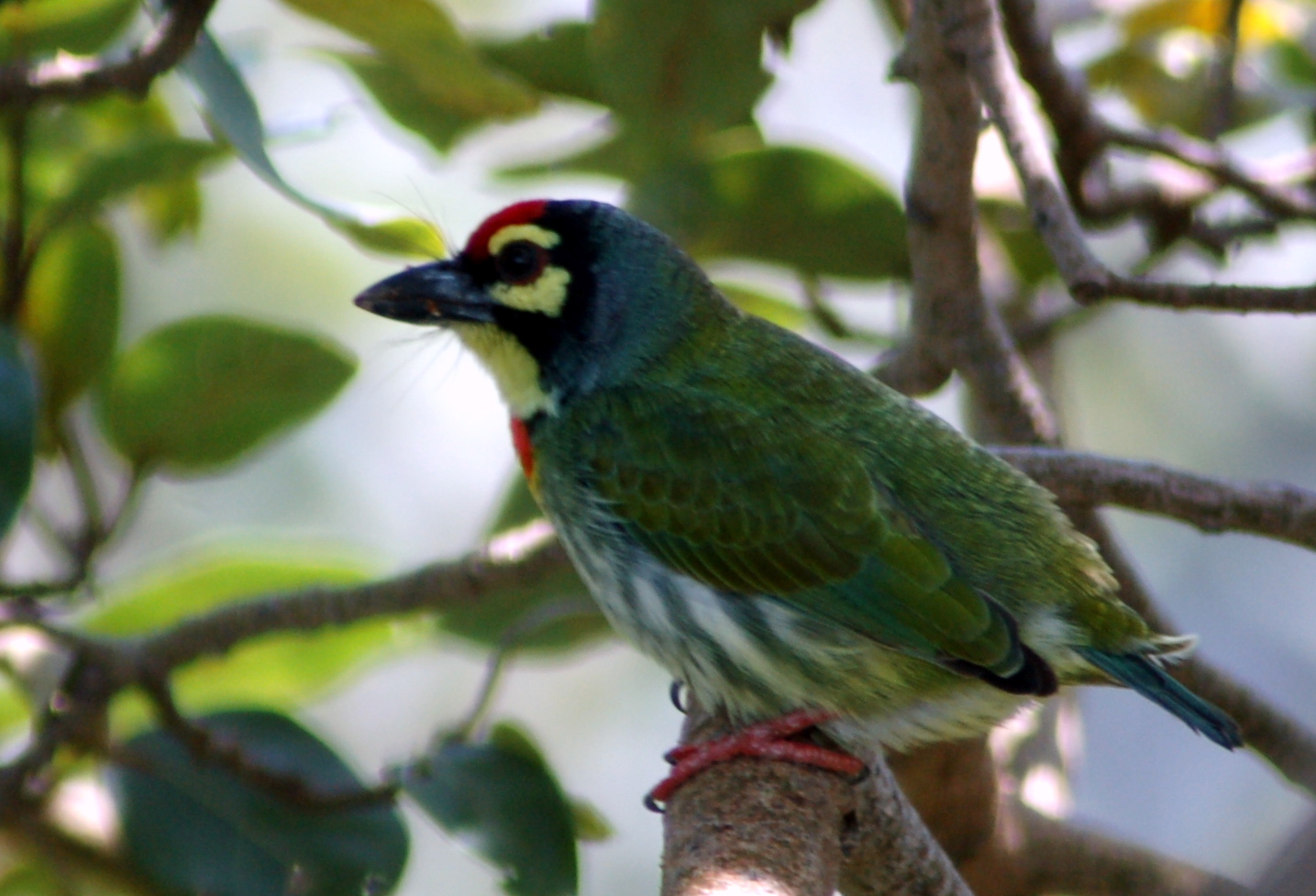
Coppersmith barbet

The Asian barbets are plump birds, with short necks and large heads. They get their name from the bristles which fringe their heavy bills. Most species are brightly coloured.

- Coppersmith barbet, Psilopogon haemacephalus
- Great barbet, Psilopogon virens
- Brown-headed barbet, Psilopogon zeylanicus
- Blue-throated barbet, Psilopogon asiaticus

== Honeyguides ==
Order: Piciformes Family: Indicatoridae

Honeyguides are among the few birds that feed on wax. They are named for the greater honeyguide which leads traditional honey-hunters to bees' nests and, after the hunters have harvested the honey, feeds on the remaining contents of the hive.

- Yellow-rumped honeyguide, Indicator xanthonotus

== Woodpeckers ==
Order: Piciformes Family: Picidae

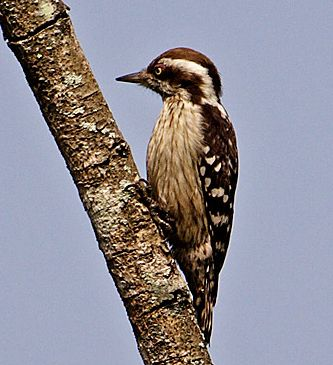
Brown-capped pygmy woodpecker

Woodpeckers are small to medium-sized birds with chisel-like beaks, short legs, stiff tails and long tongues used for capturing insects. Some species have feet with two toes pointing forward and two backward, while several species have only three toes. Many woodpeckers have the habit of tapping noisily on tree trunks with their beaks.

- Eurasian wryneck, Jynx torquilla
- Speckled piculet, Picumnus innominatus
- Brown-capped pygmy woodpecker, Yungipicus nanus
- Gray-capped pygmy woodpecker, Yungipicus canicapillus
- Yellow-crowned woodpecker, Leiopicus mahrattensis
- Brown-fronted woodpecker, Dendrocoptes auriceps
- Rufous-bellied woodpecker, Dendrocopos hyperythrus
- Fulvous-breasted woodpecker, Dendrocopos macei
- Himalayan woodpecker, Dendrocopos himalayensis
- Sind woodpecker, Dendrocopos assimilis
- Rufous woodpecker, Micropternus brachyurus
- Black-rumped flameback, Dinopium benghalense
- Scaly-bellied woodpecker, Picus squamatus
- Gray-headed woodpecker, Picus canus
- Lesser yellownape, Picus chlorolophus (V)

== Falcons and caracaras ==
Order: Falconiformes Family: Falconidae

Falconidae is a family of diurnal birds of prey. They differ from hawks, eagles and kites in that they kill with their beaks instead of their talons. Most species have declined rapidly due to their demand for the falcon hunting trade.

- Lesser kestrel, Falco naumanni
- Eurasian kestrel, Falco tinnunculus
- Red-necked falcon, Falco chicquera
- Red-footed falcon, Falco vespertinus
- Amur falcon, Falco amurensis
- Sooty falcon, Falco concolor
- Merlin, Falco columbarius
- Eurasian hobby, Falco subbuteo
- Oriental hobby, Falco severus
- Lanner falcon, Falco biarmicus
- Laggar falcon, Falco jugger
- Saker falcon, Falco cherrug
- Gyrfalcon, Falco rusticolus
- Peregrine falcon, Falco peregrinus
  - Shaheen falcon, Falco peregrinus peregrinator, is used in the logo of the Pakistani Air Force.
  - Barbary falcon, Falco peregrinus pelegrinoides

== Old World parrots ==
Order: Psittaciformes Family: Psittaculidae

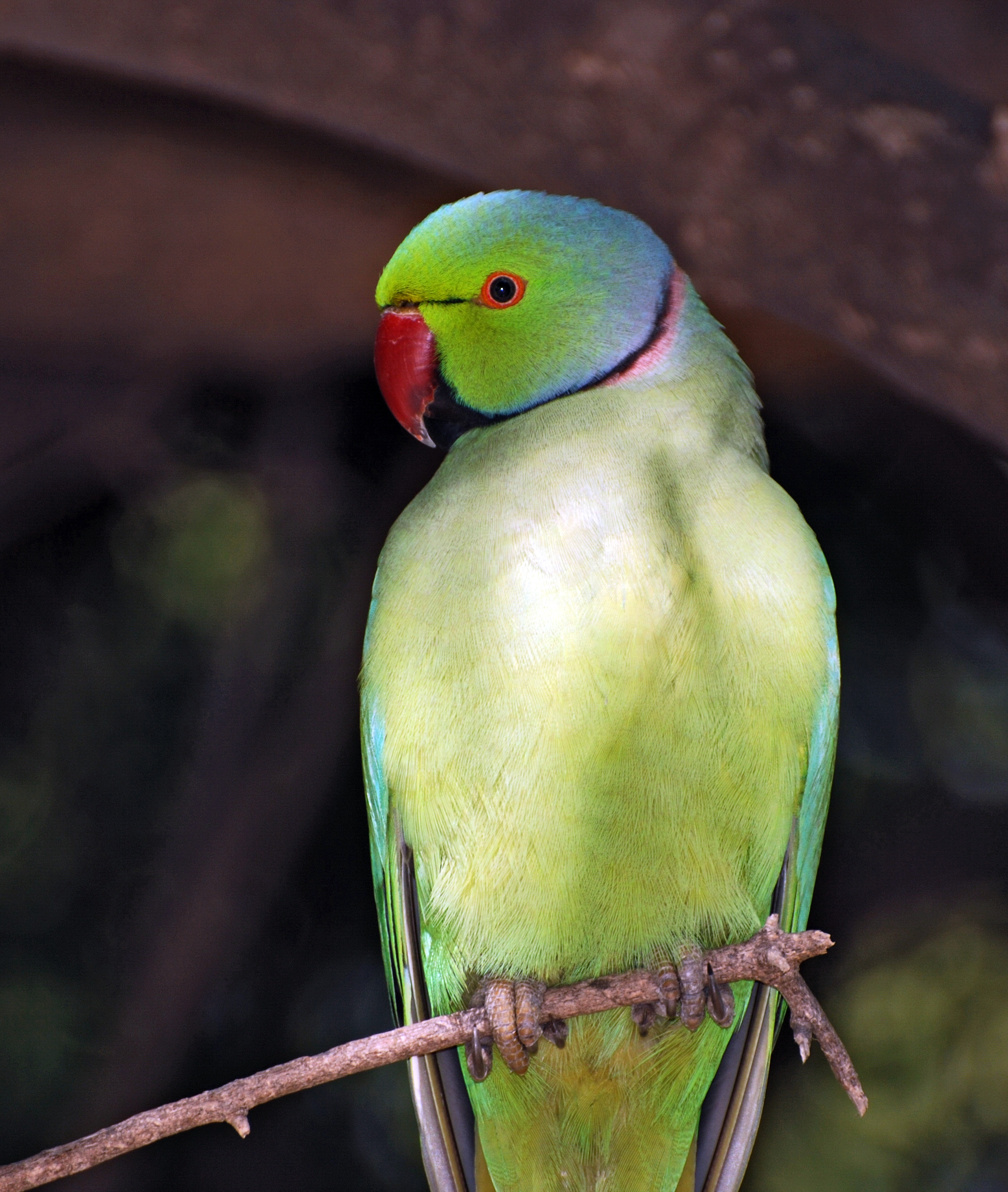
The rose-ringed parakeet is the territorial bird of Islamabad.

Characteristic features of parrots include a strong curved bill, an upright stance, strong legs, and clawed zygodactyl feet. Many parrots are vividly coloured, and some are multi-coloured. In size they range from 8 cm (3.1 in) to 1 m (3.3 ft) in length. Old World parrots are found from Africa east across south and southeast Asia and Oceania to Australia and New Zealand.

- Alexandrine parakeet, Psittacula eupatria
- Rose-ringed parakeet, Psittacula krameri
- Slaty-headed parakeet, Psittacula himalayana
- Plum-headed parakeet, Psittacula cyanocephala

== Pittas ==
Order: Passeriformes Family: Pittidae

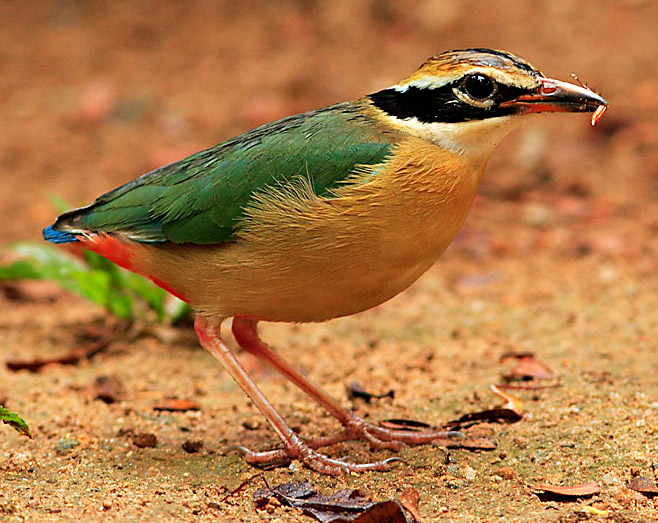
Indian pitta

Pittas are medium-sized by passerine standards and are stocky, with fairly long, strong legs, short tails and stout bills. Many are brightly coloured. They spend the majority of their time on wet forest floors, eating snails, insects and similar invertebrates.

- Indian pitta, Pitta brachyura

== Cuckooshrikes ==
Order: Passeriformes Family: Campephagidae

White-bellied minivet

The cuckooshrikes are small to medium-sized passerine birds. They are predominantly greyish with white and black, although some species are brightly coloured.

- White-bellied minivet, Pericrocotus erythropygius
- Small minivet, Pericrocotus cinnamomeus
- Grey-chinned minivet, Pericrocotus solaris
- Long-tailed minivet, Pericrocotus ethologus
- Scarlet minivet, Pericrocotus flammeus
- Rosy minivet, Pericrocotus roseus
- Large cuckooshrike, Coracina macei
- Black-winged cuckooshrike, Coracina melaschistos
- Black-headed cuckooshrike, Coracina melanoptera

== Vireos, shrike-babblers, and erpornis ==
Order: Passeriformes Family: Vireonidae

The vireos are a group of small to medium-sized passerine birds. They are typically greenish in color and resemble wood warblers apart from their heavier bills.

- White-browed shrike-babbler, Pteruthius aeralatus
- Green shrike-babbler, Pteruthius xanthochlorus

== Old World orioles ==
Order: Passeriformes Family: Oriolidae

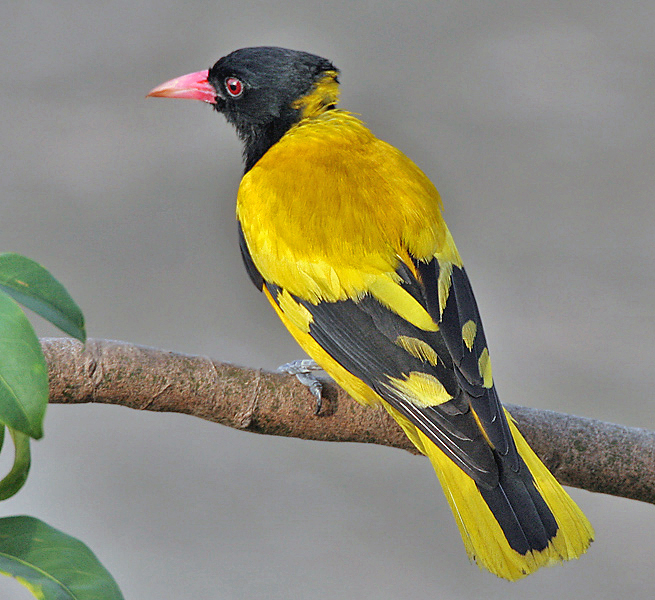
Black-hooded oriole

The Old World orioles are colourful passerine birds. They are not related to the New World orioles.

- Eurasian golden oriole, Oriolus oriolus
- Indian golden oriole, Oriolus kundoo
- Black-naped oriole, Oriolus chinensis
- Black-hooded oriole, Oriolus xanthornus
- Maroon oriole, Oriolus traillii

== Vangas, helmetshrikes, and allies ==
Order: Passeriformes Family: Vangidae

The Vangidae comprises a group of often shrike-like medium-sized birds distributed from Asia to Africa. Many species in this family were previously classified elsewhere in other families.

- Common woodshrike, Tephrodornis pondicerianus

== Ioras ==
Order: Passeriformes Family: Aegithinidae

The ioras are bulbul-like birds of open forest or thorn scrub, but whereas that group tends to be drab in colouration, ioras are sexually dimorphic, with the males being brightly plumaged in yellows and greens.

- Common iora, Aegithina tiphia
- White-tailed iora, Aegithina nigrolutea

== Fantails ==
Order: Passeriformes Family: Rhipiduridae

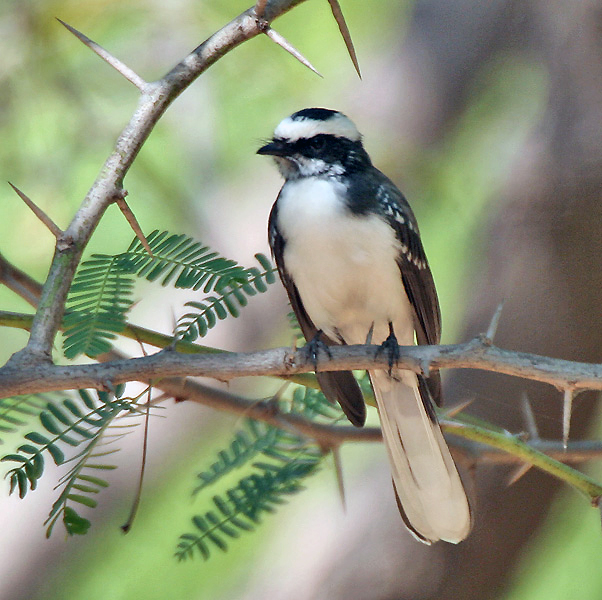
White-browed fantail

The fantails are small insectivorous birds which are specialist aerial feeders.

- White-throated fantail, Rhipidura albicollis
- White-browed fantail, Rhipidura aureola

== Drongos ==
Order: Passeriformes Family: Dicruridae

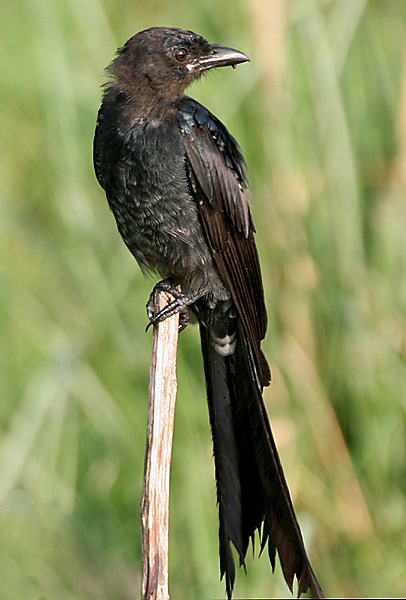
Black drongo

The drongos are mostly black or dark grey in colour, sometimes with metallic tints. They have long forked tails, and some Asian species have elaborate tail decorations. They have short legs and sit very upright when perched, like a shrike. They flycatch or take prey from the ground.

- Black drongo, Dicrurus macrocercus
- Ashy drongo, Dicrurus leucophaeus
- White-bellied drongo, Dicrurus caerulescens
- Hair-crested drongo, Dicrurus hottentottus

== Monarch flycatchers ==
Order: Passeriformes Family: Monarchidae

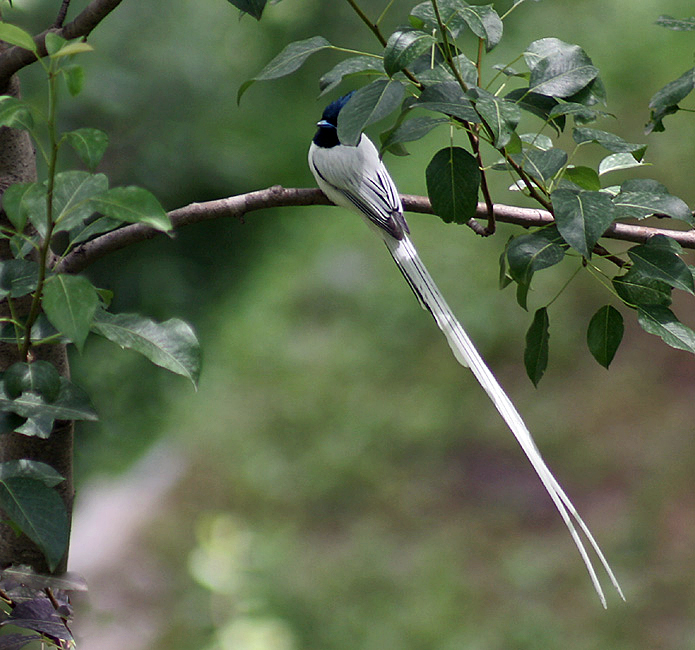
Indian paradise flycatcher

The monarch flycatchers are small to medium-sized insectivorous passerines which hunt by flycatching.

- Black-naped monarch, Hypothymis azurea
- Indian paradise flycatcher, Terpsiphone paradisi

== Shrikes ==
Order: Passeriformes Family: Laniidae

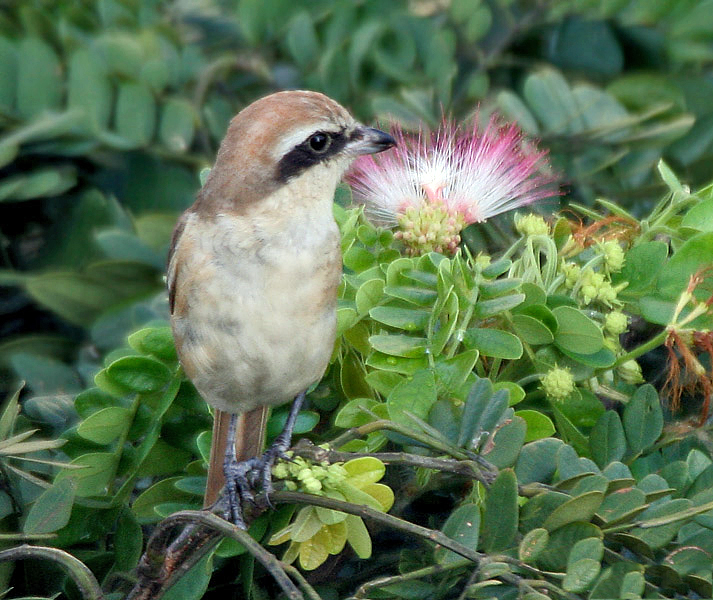
Brown shrike

Shrikes are passerine birds known for their habit of catching other birds and small animals and impaling the uneaten portions of their bodies on thorns. A typical shrike's beak is hooked, like a bird of prey.

- Red-backed shrike, Lanius collurio
- Red-tailed shrike, Lanius phoenicuroides
- Isabelline shrike, Lanius isabellinus
- Brown shrike, Lanius cristatus
- Bay-backed shrike, Lanius vittatus
- Long-tailed shrike, Lanius schach
- Gray-backed shrike, Lanius tephronotus
- Great gray shrike, Lanius excubitor
- Lesser gray shrike, Lanius minor (V)
- Woodchat shrike, Lanius senator

== Crows, jays, and magpies ==
Order: Passeriformes Family: Corvidae

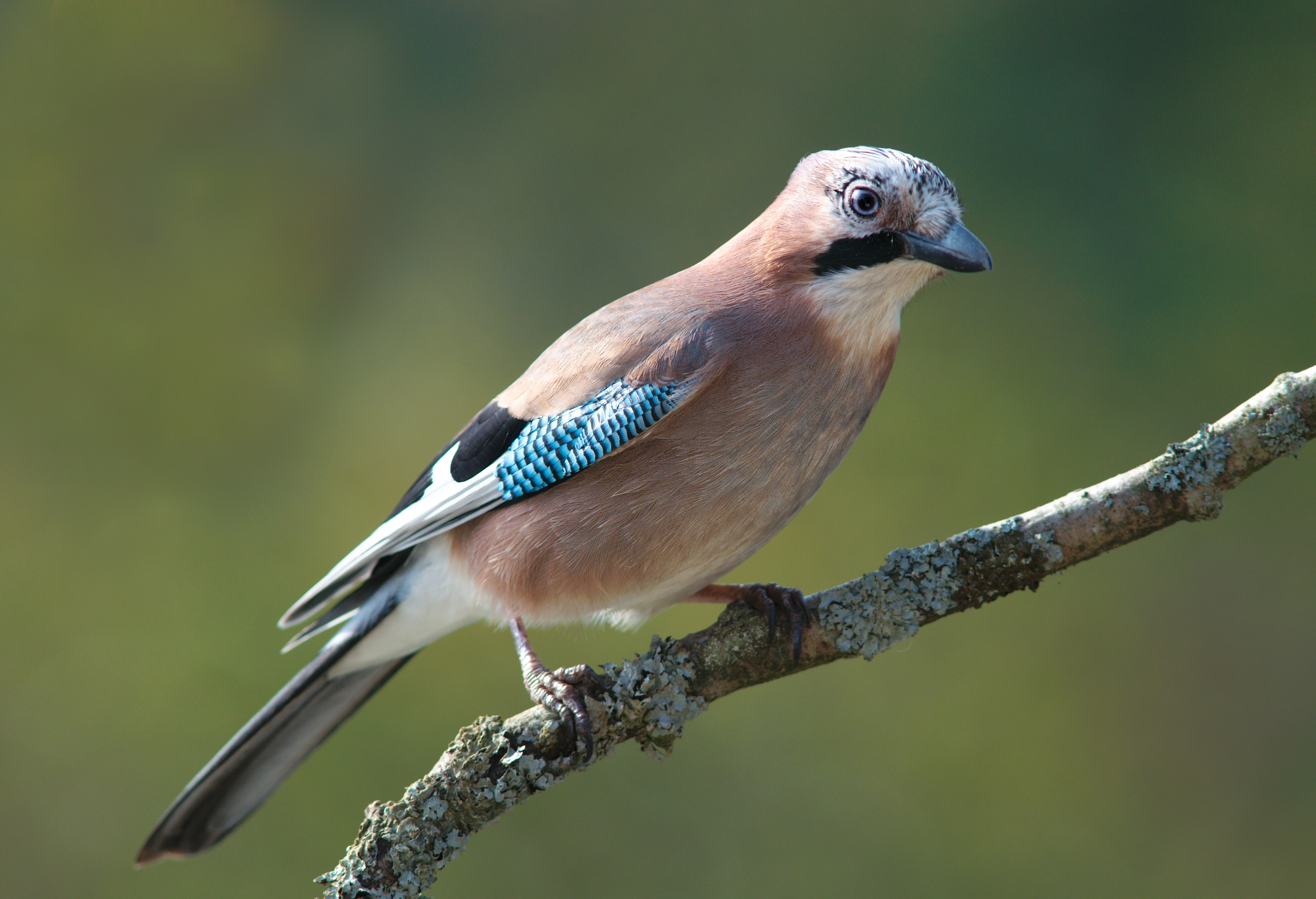
Eurasian jay

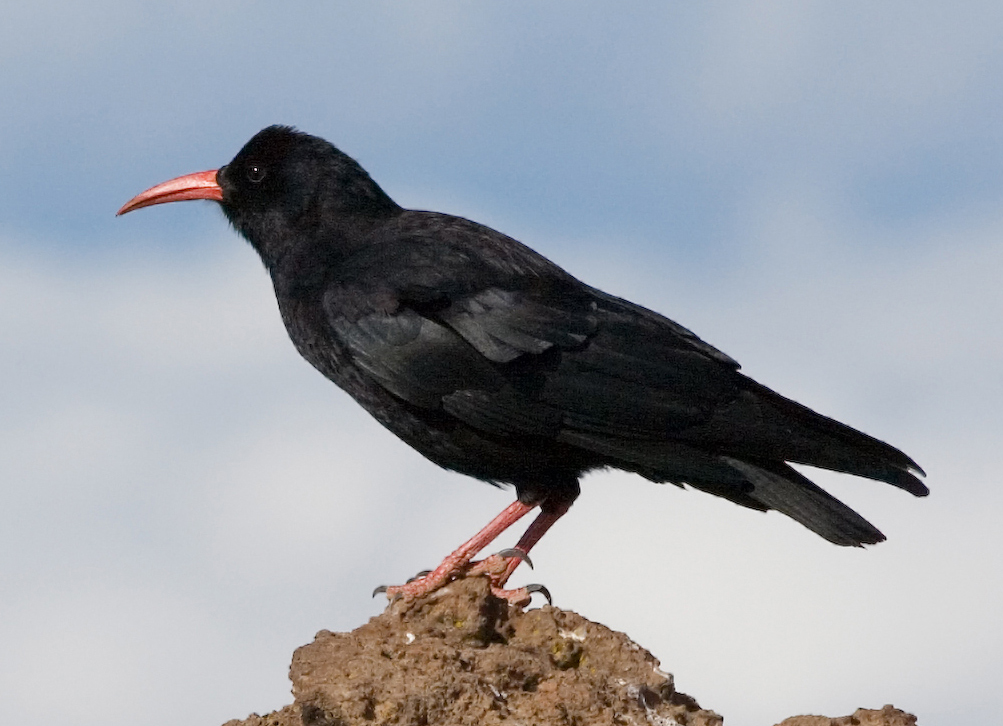
Red-billed chough

The family Corvidae includes crows, ravens, jays, choughs, magpies, treepies, nutcrackers and ground jays. Corvids are above average in size among the Passeriformes, and some of the larger species show high levels of intelligence.

- Eurasian jay, Garrulus glandarius
- Black-headed jay, Garrulus lanceolatus
- Yellow-billed blue-magpie, Urocissa flavirostris
- Red-billed blue-magpie, Urocissa erythroryncha
- Rufous treepie, Dendrocitta vagabunda
- Gray treepie, Dendrocitta formosae
- Eurasian magpie, Pica pica
- Eurasian nutcracker, Nucifraga caryocatactes
- Kashmir nutcracker, Nucifraga multipunctata
- Red-billed chough, Pyrrhocorax pyrrhocorax
- Yellow-billed chough, Pyrrhocorax graculus
- Eurasian jackdaw, Corvus monedula
- House crow, Corvus splendens
- Rook, Corvus frugilegus
- Carrion crow, Corvus corone
- Hooded crow, Corvus cornix
- Large-billed crow, Corvus macrorhynchos
- Brown-necked raven, Corvus ruficollis
- Common raven, Corvus corax

== Fairy flycatchers ==
Order: Passeriformes Family: Stenostiridae

Most of the species of this small family are found in Africa, though a few inhabit tropical Asia. They are not closely related to other birds called "flycatchers".

- Yellow-bellied fairy-fantail, Chelidorhynx hypoxanthus
- Gray-headed canary-flycatcher, Culicicapa ceylonensis

== Tits, chickadees, and titmice ==
Order: Passeriformes Family: Paridae

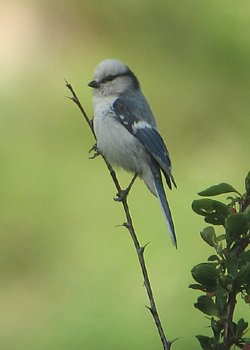
Azure tit

The Paridae are mainly small stocky woodland species with short stout bills. Some have crests. They are adaptable birds, with a mixed diet including seeds and insects. There are 10 species which have been recorded in Pakistan.

- Fire-capped tit, Cephalopyrus flammiceps
- Coal tit, Periparus ater
- Rufous-naped tit, Periparus rufonuchalis
- Rufous-vented tit, Periparus rubidiventris
- Gray-crested tit, Lophophanes dichrous
- Azure tit, Cyanistes cyanus
- Ground tit, Pseudopodoces humilis (A)
- Green-backed tit, Parus monticolus
- Great tit, Parus major
- Cinereous tit, Parus cinereus
- Himalayan black-lored tit, Parus xanthogenys
- Yellow-breasted tit, Cyanistes flavipectus

== Penduline tits ==
Order: Passeriformes Family: Remizidae

The penduline tits are a group of small passerine birds related to the true tits. They are insectivores.

- Eurasian penduline-tit, Remiz pendulinus
- White-crowned penduline-tit, Remiz coronatus

== Larks ==
Order: Passeriformes Family: Alaudidae

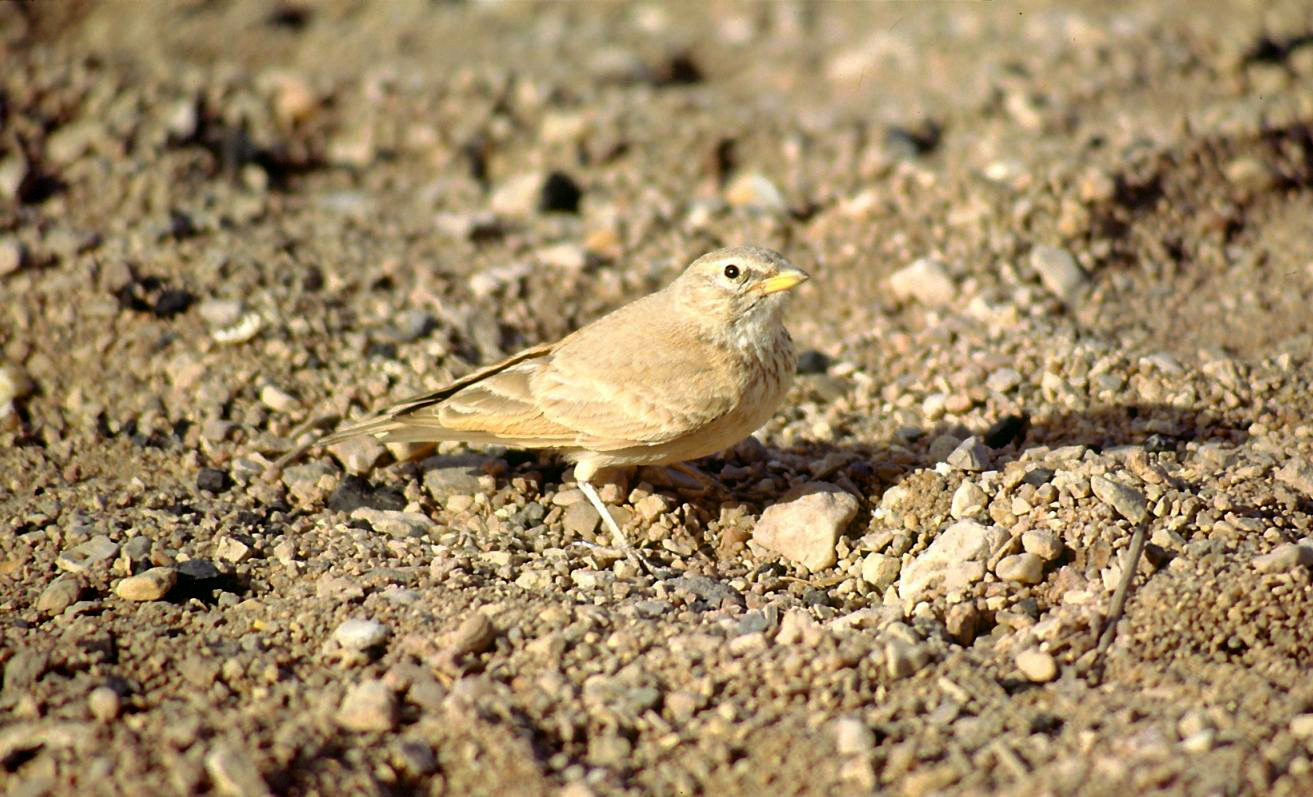
Desert lark

Larks are small terrestrial birds with often extravagant songs and display flights. Most larks are fairly dull in appearance. Their food is insects and seeds.

- Greater hoopoe-lark, Alaemon alaudipes
- Bar-tailed lark, Ammomanes cincturus
- Rufous-tailed lark, Ammomanes phoenicurus
- Desert lark, Ammomanes deserti
- Black-crowned sparrow-lark, Eremopterix nigriceps
- Ashy-crowned sparrow-lark, Eremopterix grisea
- Horsfield's bushlark, Mirafra javanica
- Indian bushlark, Mirafra erythroptera
- Horned lark, Eremophila alpestris
- Greater short-toed lark, Calandrella brachydactyla
- Mongolian short-toed lark, Calandrella dukhunensis
- Hume's lark, Calandrella acutirostris
- Bimaculated lark, Melanocorypha bimaculata
- Turkestan short-toed lark, Alaudala heinei
- Sand lark, Alaudala raytal
- Eurasian skylark, Alauda arvensis
- Oriental skylark, Alauda gulgula
- Crested lark, Galerida cristata

== Bearded reedling ==
Order: Passeriformes Family: Panuridae

This species, the only one in its family, is found in reed beds throughout temperate Europe and Asia.

- Bearded reedling, Panurus biarmicus (V)

== Cisticolas and allies ==
Order: Passeriformes Family: Cisticolidae

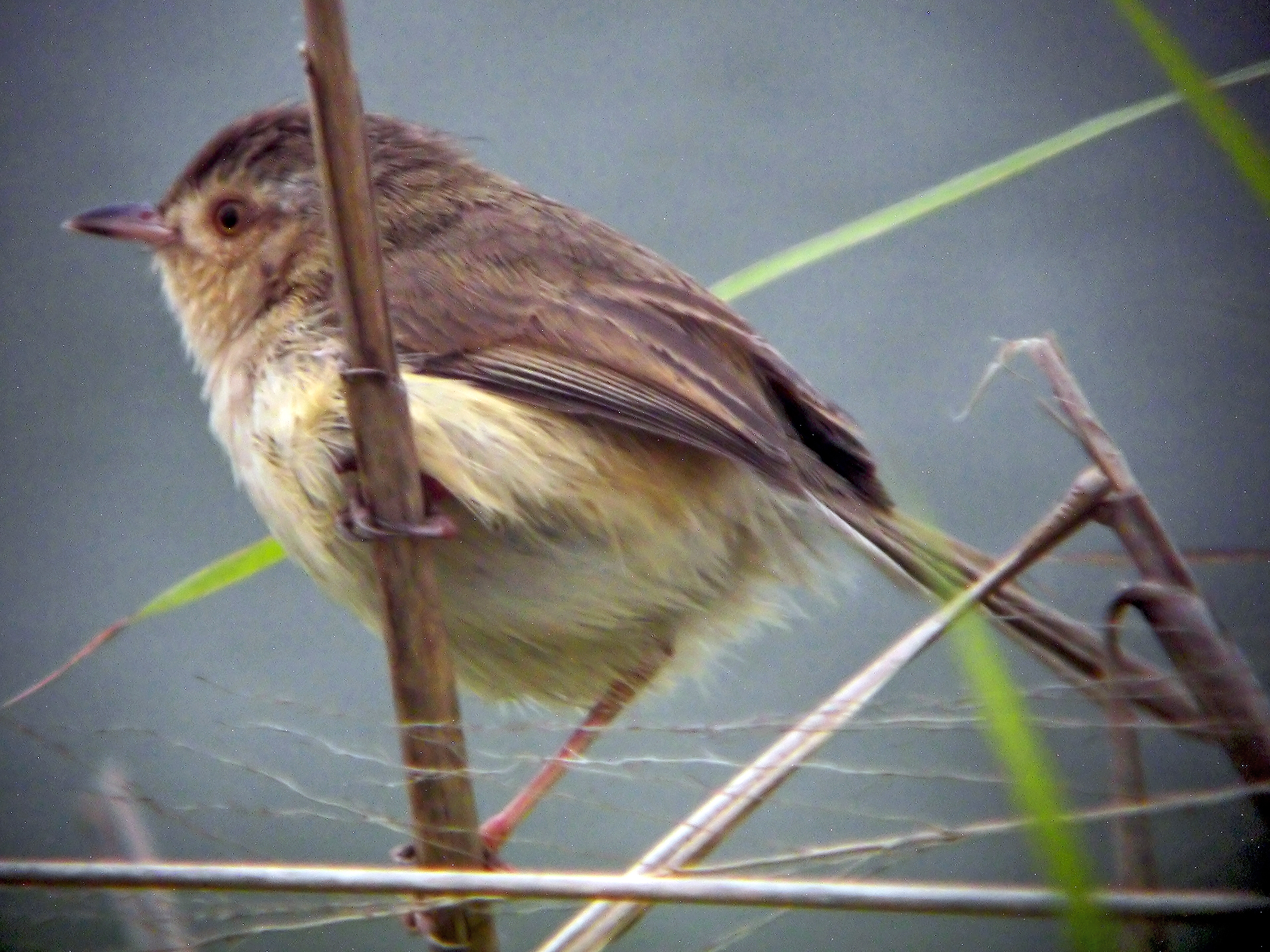
Plain prinia

The Cisticolidae are warblers found mainly in warmer southern regions of the Old World. They are generally very small birds of drab brown or grey appearance found in open country such as grassland or scrub.

- Common tailorbird, Orthotomus sutorius
- Himalayan prinia, Prinia crinigera
- Gray-crowned prinia, Prinia cinereocapilla
- Rufous-fronted prinia, Prinia buchanani
- Gray-breasted prinia, Prinia hodgsonii
- Delicate prinia, Prinia lepida
- Jungle prinia, Prinia sylvatica
- Yellow-bellied prinia, Prinia flaviventris
- Ashy prinia, Prinia socialis
- Plain prinia, Prinia inornata
- Zitting cisticola, Cisticola juncidis

== Reed warblers and allies ==
Order: Passeriformes Family: Acrocephalidae

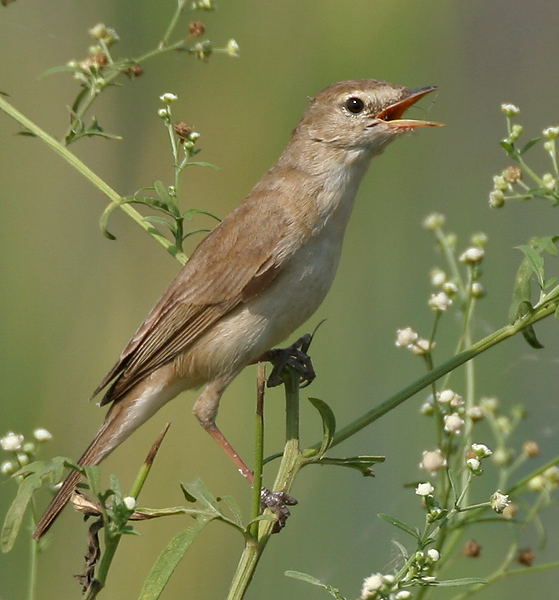
Syke's warbler

The members of this family are usually rather large for "warblers". Most are rather plain olivaceous brown above with much yellow to beige below. They are usually found in open woodland, reedbeds, or tall grass. The family occurs mostly in southern to western Eurasia and surroundings, but it also ranges far into the Pacific, with some species in Africa.

- Booted warbler, Iduna caligata
- Sykes's warbler, Iduna rama
- Upcher's warbler, Hippolais languida
- Moustached warbler, Acrocephalus melanopogon
- Sedge warbler, Acrocephalus schoenobaenus (V)
- Paddyfield warbler, Acrocephalus agricola
- Blunt-winged warbler, Acrocephalus concinens
- Blyth's reed warbler, Acrocephalus dumetorum
- Large-billed reed warbler, Acrocephalus orinus (V)
- Eurasian reed warbler, Acrocephalus scirpaceus (V)
- Great reed warbler, Acrocephalus arundinaceus (V)
- Clamorous reed warbler, Acrocephalus stentoreus

== Grassbirds and allies ==
Order: Passeriformes Family: Locustellidae

Locustellidae are a family of small insectivorous songbirds found mainly in Eurasia, Africa, and the Australian region. They are smallish birds with tails that are usually long and pointed, and tend to be drab brownish or buffy all over.

- Striated grassbird, Megalurus palustris
- Long-billed bush warbler, Locustella major
- Common grasshopper-warbler, Locustella naevia
- Bristled grassbird, Schoenicola striatus

== Swallows ==
Order: Passeriformes Family: Hirundinidae

The family Hirundinidae is adapted to aerial feeding. They have a slender streamlined body, long pointed wings and a short bill with a wide gape. The feet are adapted to perching rather than walking, and the front toes are partially joined at the base.

- Gray-throated martin, Riparia chinensis
- Bank swallow, Riparia riparia
- Pale sand martin, Riparia diluta
- Eurasian crag-martin, Ptyonoprogne rupestris
- Rock martin, Ptyonoprogne fuligula
- Dusky crag-martin, Ptyonoprogne concolor
- Barn swallow, Hirundo rustica
- Wire-tailed swallow, Hirundo smithii
- Red-rumped swallow, Cecropis daurica
- Streak-throated swallow, Petrochelidon fluvicola
- Common house-martin, Delichon urbica
- Asian house-martin, Delichon dasypus

== Bulbuls ==
Order: Passeriformes Family: Pycnonotidae

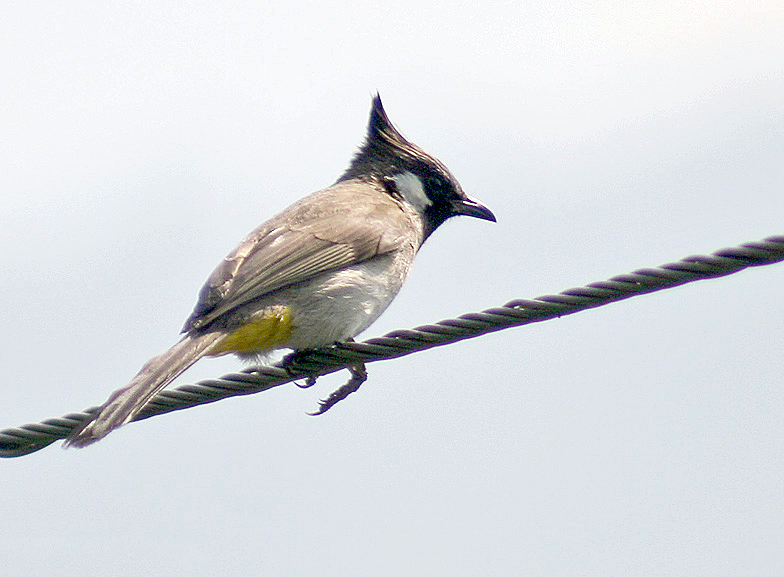
Himalayan bulbul

Bulbuls are medium-sized songbirds. Some are colourful with yellow, red or orange vents, cheeks, throats or supercilia, but most are drab, with uniform olive-brown to black plumage. Some species have distinct crests.

- Red-vented bulbul, Pycnonotus cafer
- Red-whiskered bulbul, Pycnonotus jocosus
- Black-headed bulbul, Brachypodius melanocephalos
- White-eared bulbul, Pycnonotus leucotis
- Himalayan bulbul, Pycnonotus leucogenys
- Black bulbul, Hypsipetes leucocephalus

== Leaf warblers ==
Order: Passeriformes Family: Phylloscopidae

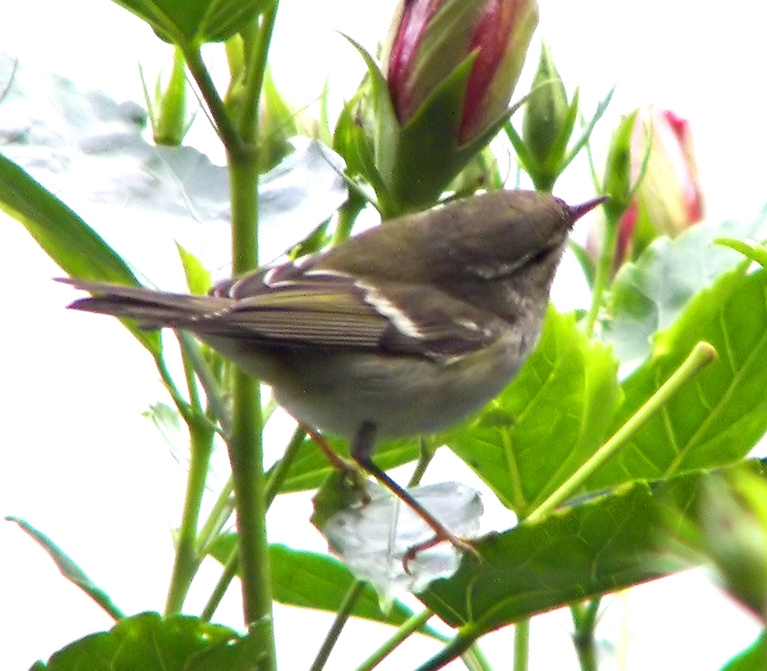
Yellow-browed warbler

Leaf warblers are a family of small insectivorous birds found mostly in Eurasia and ranging into Wallacea and Africa. The species are of various sizes, often green-plumaged above and yellow below, or more subdued with greyish-green to greyish-brown colours.

- Hume's warbler, Phylloscopus humei
- Brooks's leaf warbler, Phylloscopus subviridis
- Lemon-rumped warbler, Phylloscopus chloronotus
- Tytler's leaf warbler, Phylloscopus tytleri
- Sulphur-bellied warbler, Phylloscopus griseolus
- Tickell's leaf warbler, Phylloscopus affinis
- Plain leaf warbler, Phylloscopus neglectus
- Mountain chiffchaff, Phylloscopus sindianus
- Common chiffchaff, Phylloscopus collybita
- Green-crowned warbler, Phylloscopus burkii
- Whistler's warbler, Phylloscopus whistleri
- Green warbler, Phylloscopus nitidus
- Greenish warbler, Phylloscopus trochiloides
- Large-billed leaf warbler, Phylloscopus magnirostris
- Western crowned warbler, Phylloscopus occipitalis
- Willow warbler, Phylloscopus trochilus
- Blyth's leaf warbler, Phylloscopus reguloides
- Gray-hooded warbler, Phylloscopus xanthoschistos
- Dusky warbler, Phylloscopus fuscatus

== Bush warblers and allies ==
Order: Passeriformes Family: Scotocercidae

The members of this family are found throughout Africa, Asia, and Polynesia. Their taxonomy is in flux, and some authorities place some genera in other families.

- Scrub warbler, Scotocerca inquieta
- Gray-sided bush warbler, Cettia 'brunnifrons
- Cetti's warbler, Cettia cetti
- Brownish-flanked bush warbler, Horornis fortipes
- Hume's bush warbler, Horornis brunnescens

== Long-tailed tits ==
Order: Passeriformes Family: Aegithalidae

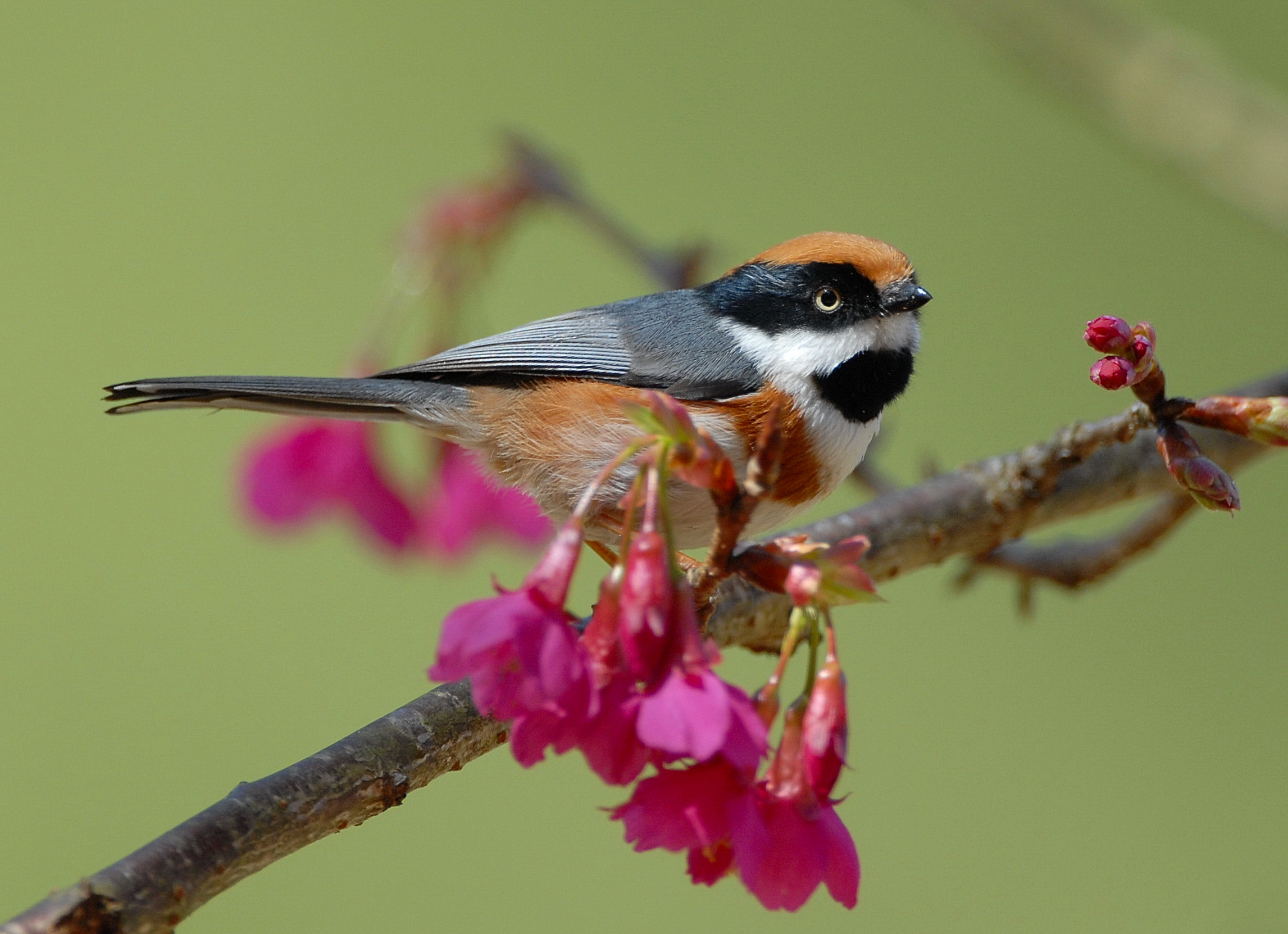
Black-throated tit

Long-tailed tits are a group of small passerine birds with medium to long tails. They make woven bag nests in trees. Most eat a mixed diet which includes insects.

- White-browed tit-warbler, Leptopoecile sophiae
- White-cheeked tit, Aegithalos leucogenys
- Black-throated tit, Aegithalos concinnus
- White-throated tit, Aegithalos niveogularis

== Sylviid warblers, parrotbills, and allies ==
Order: Passeriformes Family: Sylviidae

The family Sylviidae is a group of small insectivorous passerine birds. They mainly occur as breeding species, as the common name implies, in Europe, Asia and, to a lesser extent, Africa. Most are of generally undistinguished appearance, but many have distinctive songs.

- Asian desert warbler, Curruca nana
- Barred warbler, Curruca nisoria
- Lesser whitethroat, Curruca curruca
- Eastern Orphean warbler, Curruca crassirostris
- Menetries's warbler, Curruca mystacea
- Greater whitethroat, Curruca communis
- Yellow-eyed babbler, Chrysomma sinense
- Jerdon's babbler, Chrysomma altirostre

== White-eyes, yuhinas, and allies ==
Order: Passeriformes Family: Zosteropidae

The white-eyes are small and mostly undistinguished, their plumage above being generally some dull colour like greenish-olive, but some species have a white or bright yellow throat, breast or lower parts, and several have buff flanks. As their name suggests, many species have a white ring around each eye.

- Indian white-eye, Zosterops palpebrosus

== Tree-babblers, scimitar-babblers, and allies ==
Order: Passeriformes Family: Timaliidae

The babblers, or timaliids, are somewhat diverse in size and colouration, but are characterised by soft fluffy plumage.

- Black-chinned babbler, Stachyridopsis pyrrhops
- Rusty-cheeked scimitar-babbler, Erythrogenys erythrogenys

== Ground babblers and allies ==
Order: Passeriformes Family: Pellorneidae

These small to medium-sized songbirds have soft fluffy plumage but are otherwise rather diverse. Members of the genus Illadopsis are found in forests, but some other genera are birds of scrublands.

- Puff-throated babbler, Pellorneum ruficeps
- Rufous-vented grass babbler, Laticilla burnesii

== Laughingthrushes and allies ==
Order: Passeriformes Family: Leiothrichidae

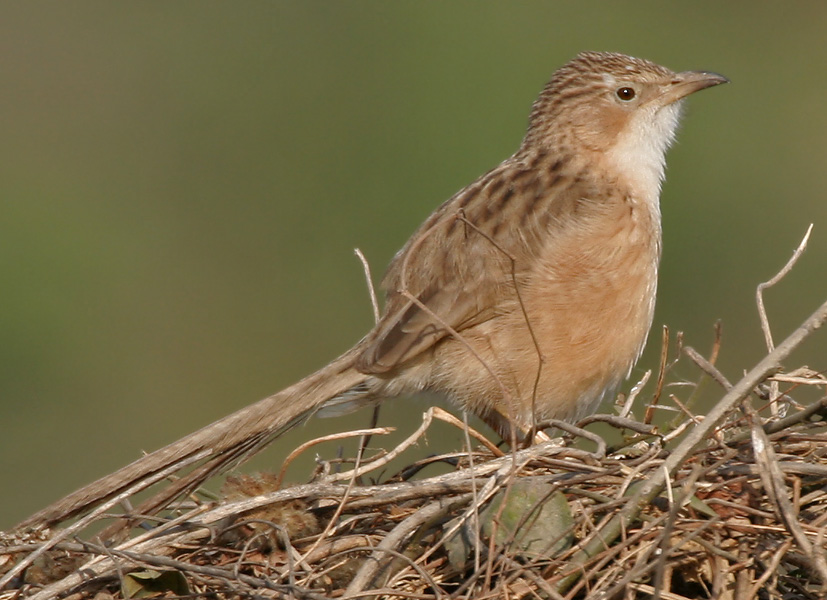
Common babbler

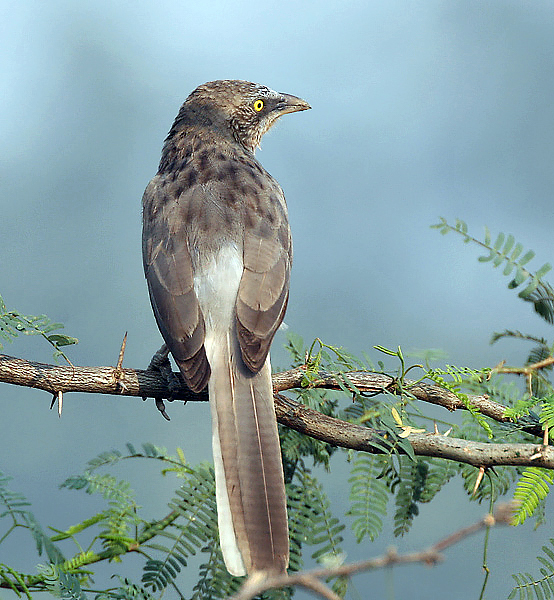
Large gray babbler

The members of this family are diverse in size and colouration, though those of genus Turdoides tend to be brown or greyish. The family is found in Africa, India, and southeast Asia.

- Brown-cheeked fulvetta, Alcippe poioicephala
- Afghan babbler, Argya huttoni
- Common babbler, Argya caudatus
- Striated babbler, Argya earlei
- Large gray babbler, Argya malcolmi
- Jungle babbler, Argya striata
- Rufous-chinned laughingthrush, Ianthocincla rufogularis
- White-throated laughingthrush, Pterorhinus albogularis
- Streaked laughingthrush, Trochalopteron lineatum
- Bhutan laughingthrush, Trochalopteron imbricatum
- Variegated laughingthrush, Trochalopteron variegatum
- Chestnut-crowned laughingthrush, Trochalopteron erythrocephalum
- Rufous sibia, Heterophasia capistrata
- Red-billed leiothrix, Leiothrix lutea

== Kinglets ==
Order: Passeriformes Family: Regulidae

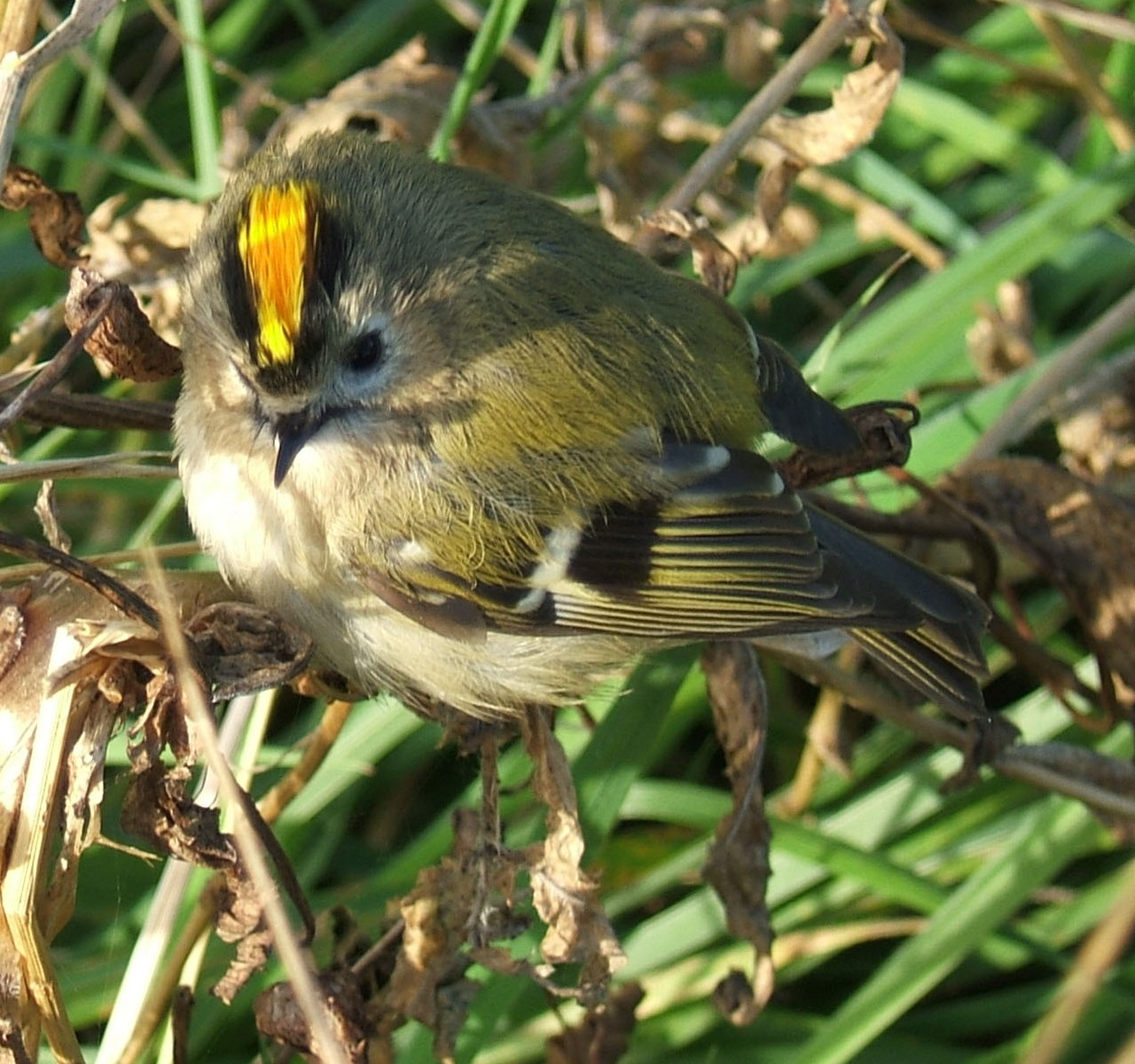
Goldcrest

The kinglets, also called crests, are a small group of birds often included in the Old World warblers, but frequently given family status because they also resemble the titmice.

- Goldcrest, Regulus regulus

== Wallcreeper ==
Order: Passeriformes Family: Tichodromidae

The wallcreeper is a small bird related to the nuthatch family, which has stunning crimson, grey and black plumage.

- Wallcreeper, Tichodroma muraria

== Nuthatches ==
Order: Passeriformes Family: Sittidae

Kashmir nuthatch

Nuthatches are small woodland birds. They have the unusual ability to climb down trees head first, unlike other birds which can only go upwards. Nuthatches have big heads, short tails and powerful bills and feet.

- Chestnut-bellied nuthatch, Sitta castanea
- Kashmir nuthatch, Sitta cashmirensis
- White-cheeked nuthatch, Sitta leucopsis
- Eastern rock nuthatch, Sitta tephronota
- Velvet-fronted nuthatch, Sitta frontalis

== Treecreepers ==
Order: Passeriformes Family: Certhiidae

Treecreepers are small woodland birds, brown above and white below. They have thin pointed down-curved bills, which they use to extricate insects from bark. They have stiff tail feathers, like woodpeckers, which they use to support themselves on vertical trees.

- Hodgson's treecreeper, Certhia hodgsoni
- Bar-tailed treecreeper, Certhia himalayana

== Wrens ==
Order: Passeriformes Family: Troglodytidae

The wrens are mainly small and inconspicuous except for their loud songs. These birds have short wings and thin down-turned bills. Several species often hold their tails upright. All are insectivorous.

- Eurasian wren, Troglodytes troglodytes

== Dippers ==
Order: Passeriformes Family: Cinclidae

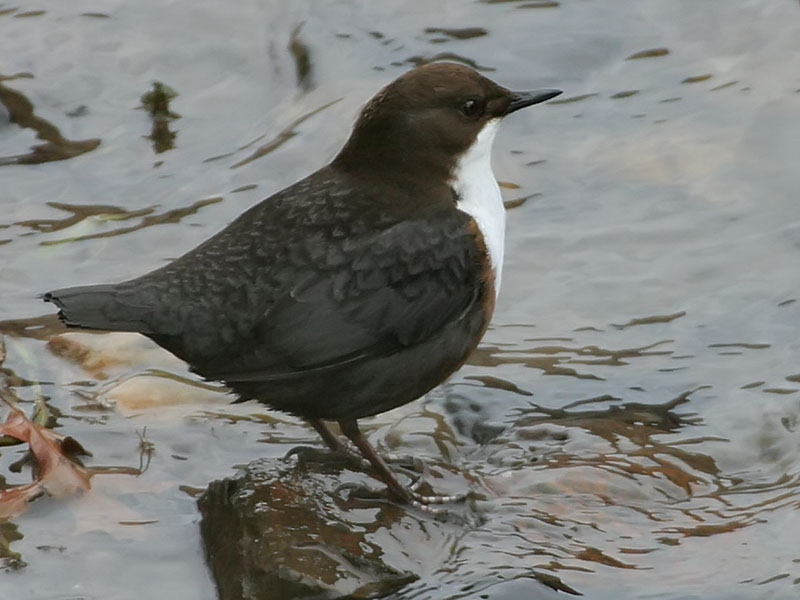
White-throated dipper

Dippers are a group of perching birds whose habitat includes aquatic environments in the Americas, Europe and Asia. They are named for their bobbing or dipping movements.

- White-throated dipper, Cinclus cinclus
- Brown dipper, Cinclus pallasii

== Starlings ==
Order: Passeriformes Family: Sturnidae

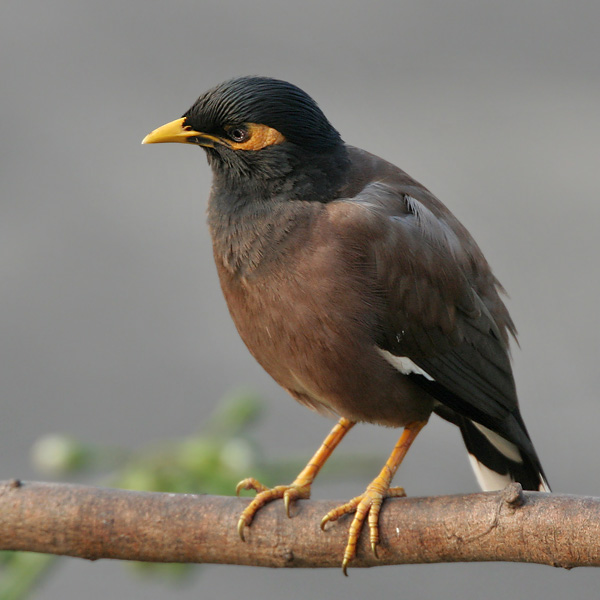
Common myna

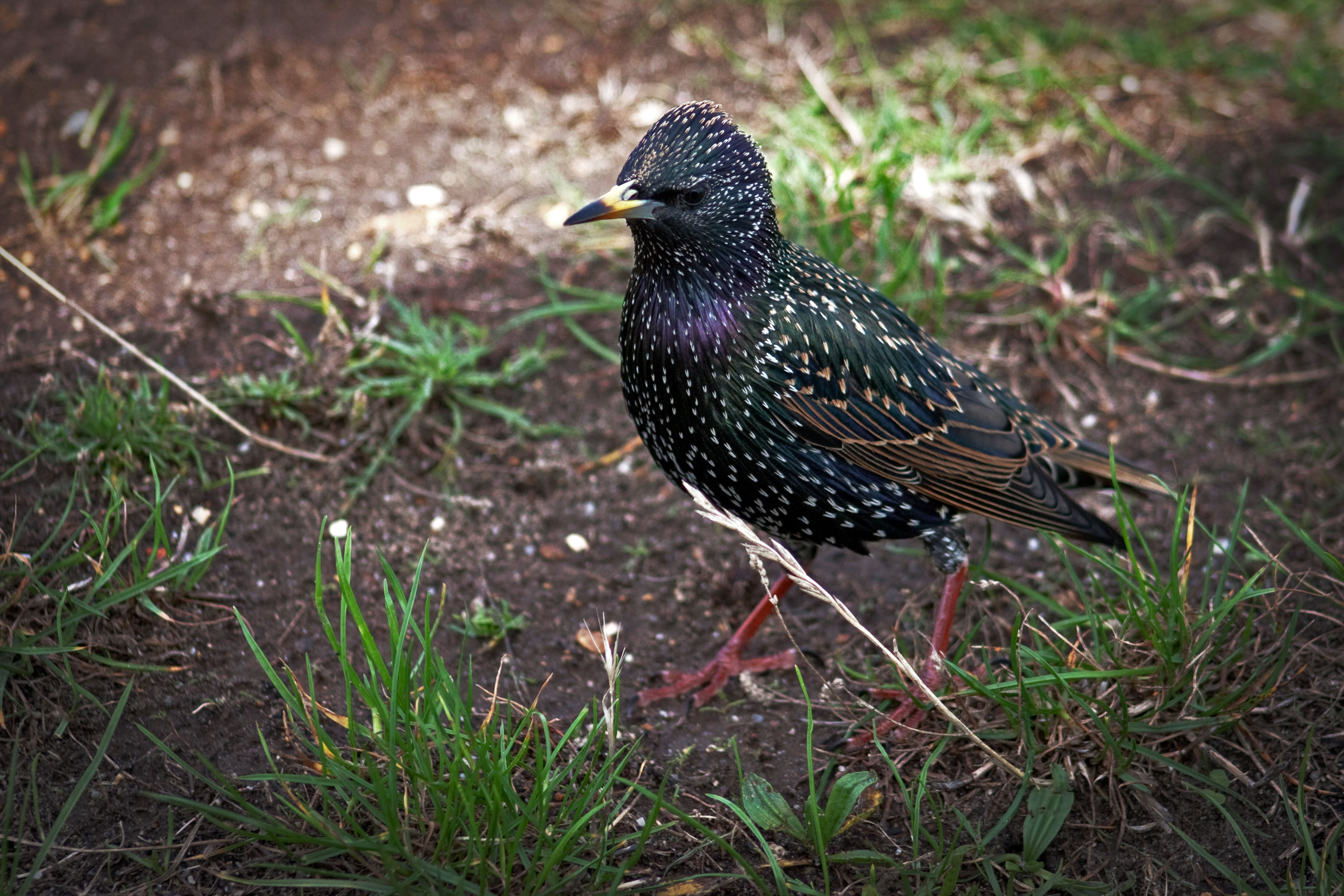
European starling

Starlings are small to medium-sized passerine birds. Their flight is strong and direct and they are very gregarious. Their preferred habitat is fairly open country. They eat insects and fruit. Plumage is typically dark with a metallic sheen.

- European starling, Sturnus vulgaris
- Rosy starling, Pastor roseus
- Daurian starling, Agropsar sturninus (V)
- Indian pied starling, Gracupica contra
- Brahminy starling, Sturnia pagodarum
- Chestnut-tailed starling, Sturnia malabarica
- Common myna, Acridotheres tristis
- Bank myna, Acridotheres ginginianus
- Jungle myna, Acridotheres fuscus
- Spot-winged starling, Saroglossa spilopterus

== Thrushes and allies ==
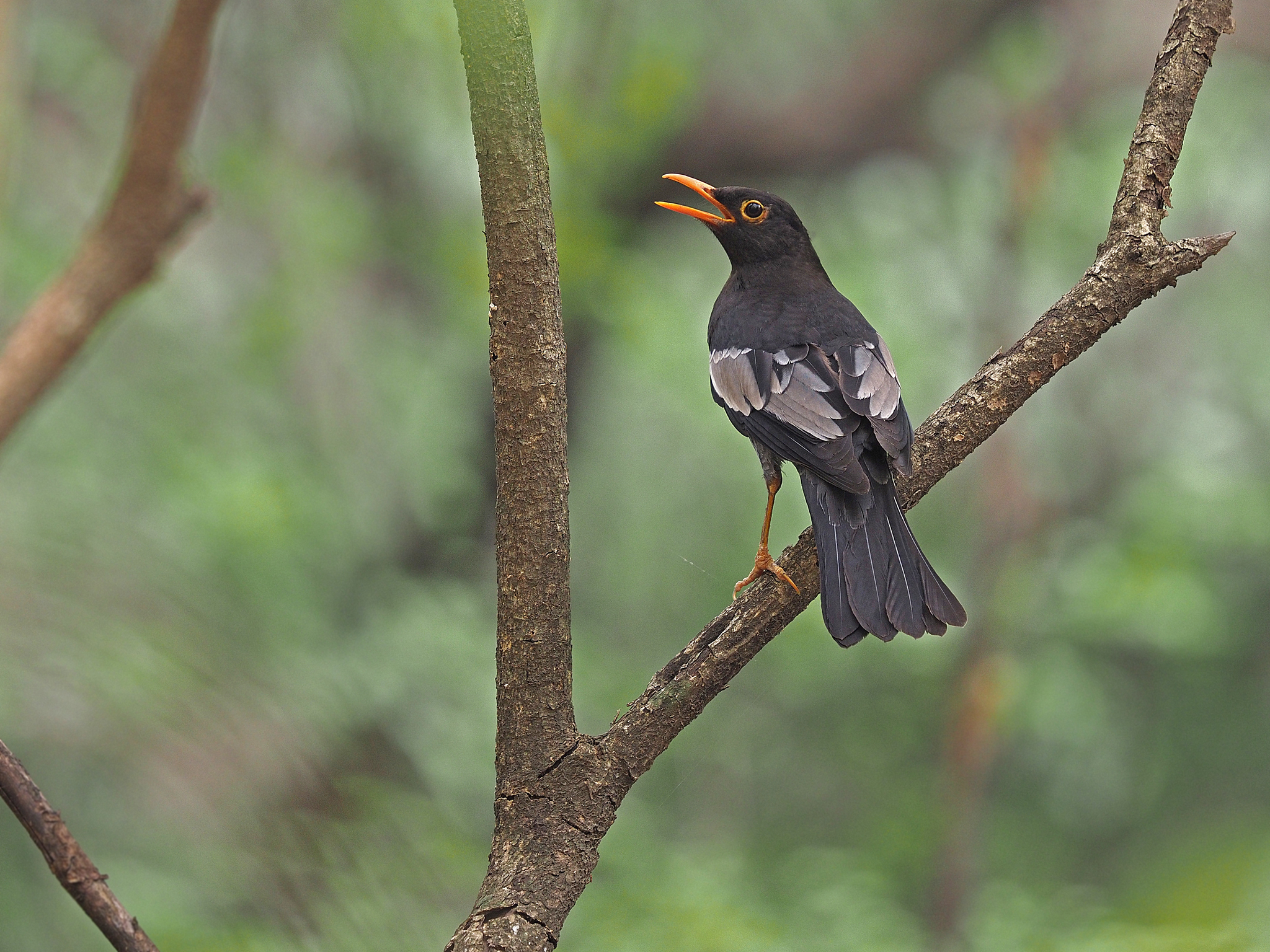
Grey-winged blackbird in Gokina

Order: Passeriformes Family: Turdidae

The thrushes are a group of passerine birds that occur mainly in the Old World. They are plump, soft plumaged, small to medium-sized insectivores or sometimes omnivores, often feeding on the ground. Many have attractive songs.

- Grandala, Grandala coelicolor
- Alpine thrush, Zoothera mollissima
- Scaly thrush, Zoothera dauma
- Orange-headed thrush, Geokichla citrina
- Mistle thrush, Turdus viscivorus
- Song thrush, Turdus philomelos (V)
- Redwing, Turdus iliacus (V)
- Eurasian blackbird, Turdus merula
- Gray-winged blackbird, Turdus boulboul
- Tickell's thrush, Turdus unicolor
- Tibetan blackbird, Turdus maximus
- White-collared blackbird, Turdus albocinctus
- Chestnut thrush, Turdus rubrocanus
- Black-throated thrush, Turdus atrogularis
- Red-throated thrush, Turdus ruficollis
- Dusky thrush, Turdus eunomus
- Song thrush, Turdus philomelos

== Old World flycatchers ==
Order: Passeriformes Family: Muscicapidae

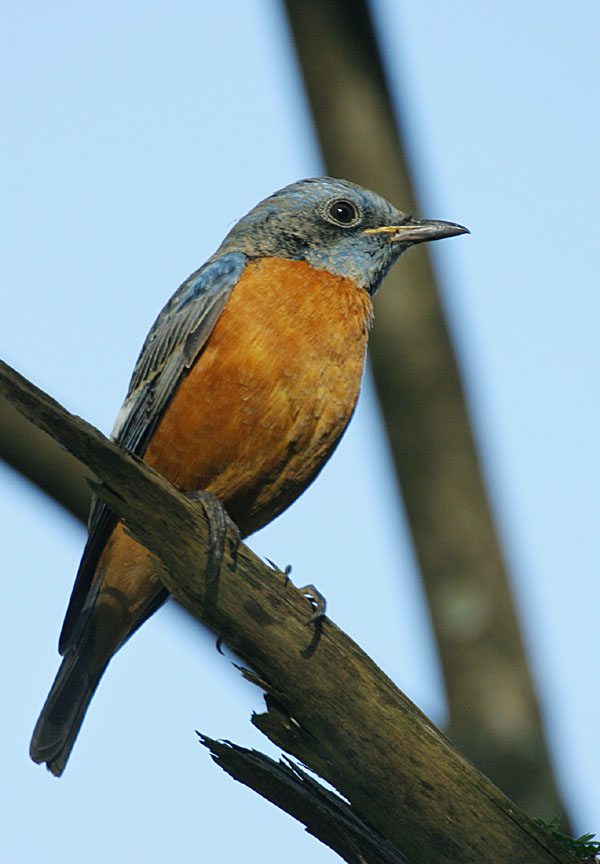
Blue-capped rock-thrush

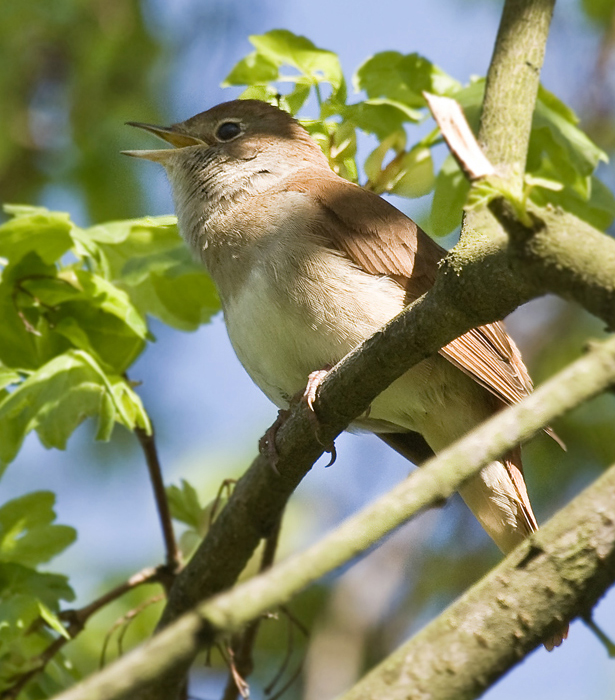
Common nightingale

Old World flycatchers are a large group of small passerine birds native to the Old World. They are mainly small arboreal insectivores. The appearance of these birds is highly varied, but they mostly have weak songs and harsh calls.

- Dark-sided flycatcher, Muscicapa sibirica
- Asian brown flycatcher, Muscicapa dauurica
- Brown-breasted flycatcher, Muscicapa muttui (A)
- Spotted flycatcher, Muscicapa striata
- Rufous-tailed scrub-robin, Cercotrichas galactotes
- Indian robin, Copsychus fulicatus
- European robin, Erithacus rubecula
- Oriental magpie-robin, Copsychus saularis
- White-rumped shama, Copsychus malabaricus
- Blue-throated flycatcher, Cyornis rubeculoides
- Tickell's blue flycatcher, Cyornis tickelliae
- Blue-and-white flycatcher, Cyanoptila cyanomelana(V)
- Rufous-bellied niltava, Niltava sundara
- Verditer flycatcher, Eumyias thalassina
- European robin, Erithacus rubecula (V)
- Indian blue robin, Larvivora brunnea
- Common nightingale, Luscinia megarhynchos (V)
- White-bellied redstart, Luscinia phaenicuroides
- Bluethroat, Luscinia svecica
- Blue whistling-thrush, Myophonus caeruleus
- Little forktail, Enicurus scouleri
- Spotted forktail, Enicurus maculatus
- Himalayan rubythroat, Calliope pectoralis
- Chinese rubythroat, Calliope tschebaiewi
- Red-flanked bluetail, Tarsiger cyanurus
- Himalayan bluetail, Tarsiger rufilatus
- Golden bush-robin, Tarsiger chrysaeus
- Slaty-blue flycatcher, Ficedula tricolor
- Rufous-gorgeted flycatcher, Ficedula strophiata
- Ultramarine flycatcher, Ficedula superciliaris
- Rusty-tailed flycatcher, Ficedula ruficauda
- Taiga flycatcher, Ficedula albicilla
- Kashmir flycatcher, Ficedula subrubra
- Red-breasted flycatcher, Ficedula parva
- Little pied flycatcher, Ficedula westermanni
- Blue-fronted redstart, Phoenicurus frontalis
- Plumbeous redstart, Phoenicurus fuliginosus
- Rufous-backed redstart, Phoenicurus erythronotus
- White-capped redstart, Phoenicurus leucocephalus
- Blue-capped redstart, Phoenicurus caeruleocephala
- Common redstart, Phoenicurus phoenicurus
- White-winged redstart, Phoenicurus erythrogastrus
- Black redstart, Phoenicurus ochruros
- Chestnut-bellied rock-thrush, Monticola rufiventris
- Blue-capped rock-thrush, Monticola cinclorhyncha
- Rufous-tailed rock-thrush, Monticola saxatilis
- Blue rock-thrush, Monticola solitarius
- White-browed bushchat, Saxicola macrorhynchus
- Siberian stonechat, Saxicola maurus
- White-tailed stonechat, Saxicola leucurus
- Pied bushchat, Saxicola caprata
- Gray bushchat, Saxicola ferreus
- Northern wheatear, Oenanthe oenanthe
- Isabelline wheatear, Oenanthe isabellina
- Hooded wheatear, Oenanthe monacha
- Desert wheatear, Oenanthe deserti
- Pied wheatear, Oenanthe pleschanka
- Brown rock chat, Cercomela fusca
- Variable wheatear, Oenanthe picata
- Hume's wheatear, Oenanthe alboniger
- Finsch's wheatear, Oenanthe finschii
- Mourning wheatear, Oenanthe lugens
- Persian wheatear, Oenanthe chrysopygia

== Waxwings ==
Order: Passeriformes Family: Bombycillidae

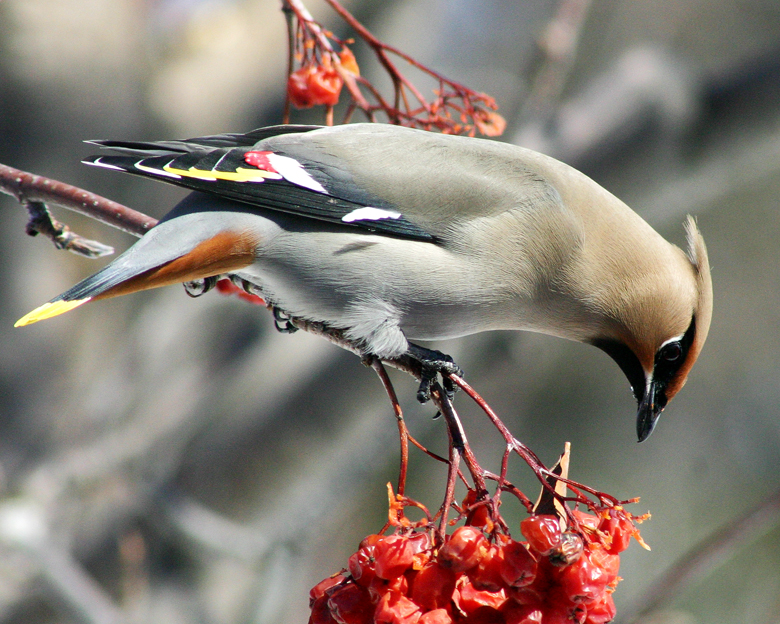
Bohemian waxwing

The waxwings are a group of birds with soft silky plumage and unique red tips to some of the wing feathers. In the Bohemian and cedar waxwings, these tips look like sealing wax and give the group its name. These are arboreal birds of northern forests. They live on insects in summer and berries in winter.

- Bohemian waxwing, Bombycilla garrulus

== Hypocolius ==
Order: Passeriformes Family: Hypocoliidae

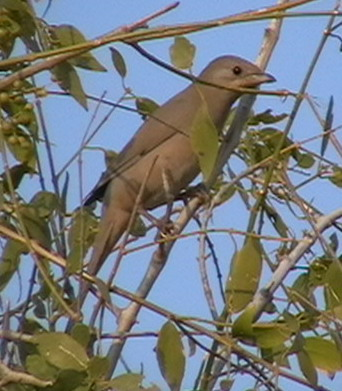
Hypocolius

The hypocolius is a small Middle Eastern bird with the shape and soft plumage of a waxwing. They are mainly a uniform grey colour except the males have a black triangular mask around their eyes.

- Hypocolius, Hypocolius ampelinus

== Flowerpeckers ==
Order: Passeriformes Family: Dicaeidae

The flowerpeckers are very small, stout, often brightly coloured birds, with short tails, short thick curved bills and tubular tongues.

- Thick-billed flowerpecker, Dicaeum agile
- Pale-billed flowerpecker, Dicaeum erythrorhynchos

== Sunbirds and spiderhunters ==
Order: Passeriformes Family: Nectariniidae

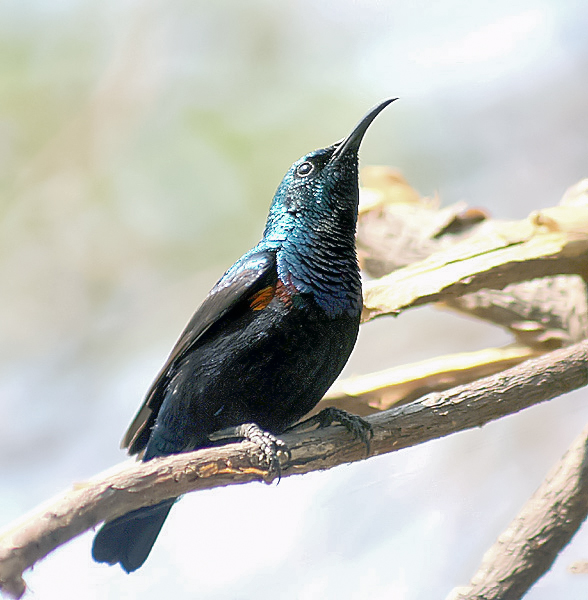
Purple sunbird

The sunbirds and spiderhunters are very small passerine birds which feed largely on nectar, although they will also take insects, especially when feeding young. Flight is fast and direct on their short wings. Most species can take nectar by hovering like a hummingbird, but usually perch to feed.

- Purple sunbird, Cinnyris asiaticus
- Crimson sunbird, Aethopyga siparaja
- Mrs Gould's sunbird, Aethopyga gouldiae

== Weavers and allies ==
Order: Passeriformes Family: Ploceidae

The weavers are small passerine birds related to the finches. They are seed-eating birds with rounded conical bills. The males of many species are brightly coloured, usually in red or yellow and black, some species show variation in colour only in the breeding season.

- Streaked weaver, Ploceus manyar
- Baya weaver, Ploceus philippinus
- Black-breasted weaver, Ploceus benghalensis

== Waxbills and allies ==
Order: Passeriformes Family: Estrildidae

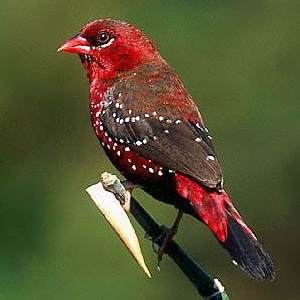
Red avadavat

The estrildid finches are small passerine birds of the Old World tropics and Australasia. They are gregarious and often colonial seed eaters with short thick but pointed bills. They are all similar in structure and habits, but have wide variation in plumage colours and patterns.

- Red avadavat, Amandava amandava
- Indian silverbill, Euodice malabarica
- Scaly-breasted munia, Lonchura punctulata
- Tricolored munia, Lonchura malacca (V)

== Accentors ==
Order: Passeriformes Family: Prunellidae

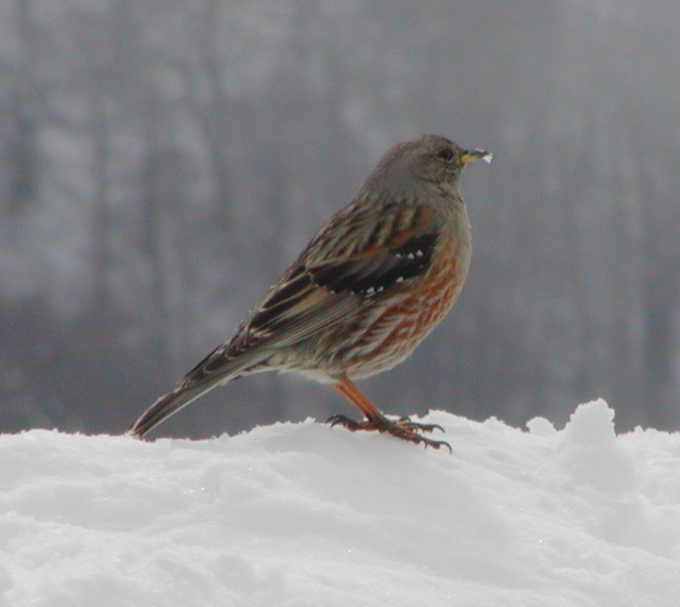
Alpine accentor

The accentors are in the only bird family, Prunellidae, which is completely endemic to the Palearctic. They are small, fairly drab species superficially similar to sparrows.

- Alpine accentor, Prunella collaris
- Altai accentor, Prunella himalayana
- Robin accentor, Prunella rubeculoides
- Rufous-breasted accentor, Prunella strophiata
- Radde's accentor, Prunella ocularis
- Brown accentor, Prunella fulvescens
- Black-throated accentor, Prunella atrogularis

== Old World sparrows ==
Order: Passeriformes Family: Passeridae

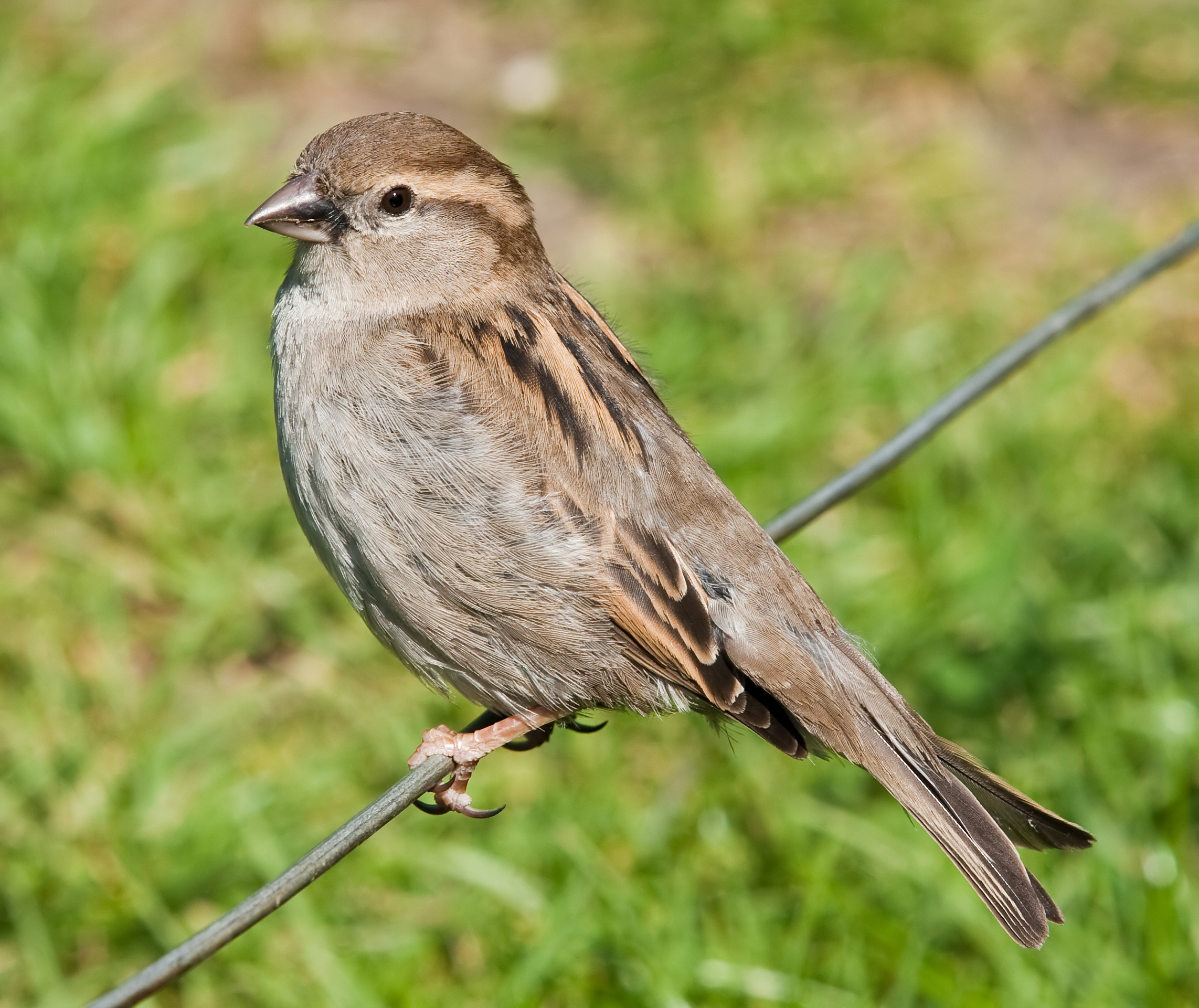
House sparrow

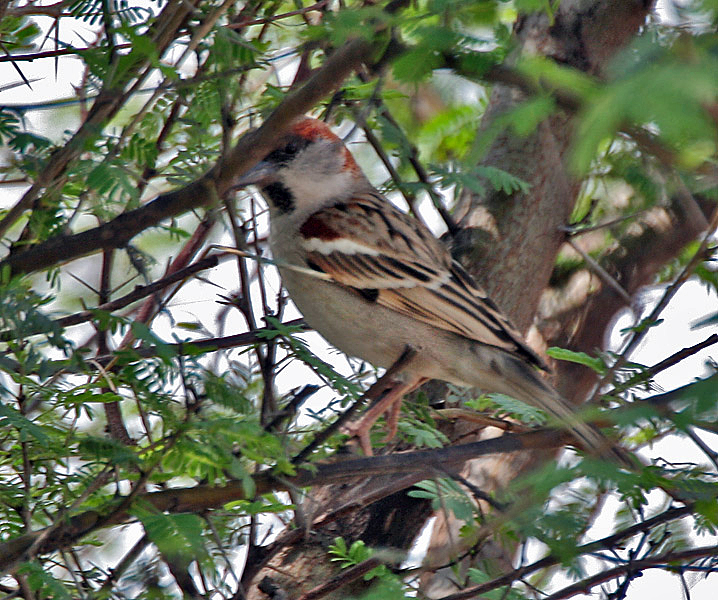
The Sind sparrow is the provincial bird of Sindh.

Old World sparrows are small passerine birds. In general, Old World sparrows tend to be small, plump, brown or grey birds with short tails and short powerful beaks. Old World sparrows are seed eaters, but they also consume small insects.

- House sparrow, Passer domesticus
- Spanish sparrow, Passer hispaniolensis
- Sind sparrow, Passer pyrrhonotus
- Russet sparrow, Passer cinnamomeus
- Dead Sea sparrow, Passer moabiticus
- Eurasian tree sparrow, Passer montanus
- Yellow-throated sparrow, Gymnoris xanthocollis
- Rock sparrow, Petronia petronia
- Pale rockfinch, Carpospiza brachydactyla
- White-winged snowfinch, Montifringilla nivalis
- Black-winged snowfinch, Montifringilla adamsi
- Blanford's snowfinch, Montifringilla blanfordi

== Wagtails and pipits ==
Order: Passeriformes Family: Motacillidae

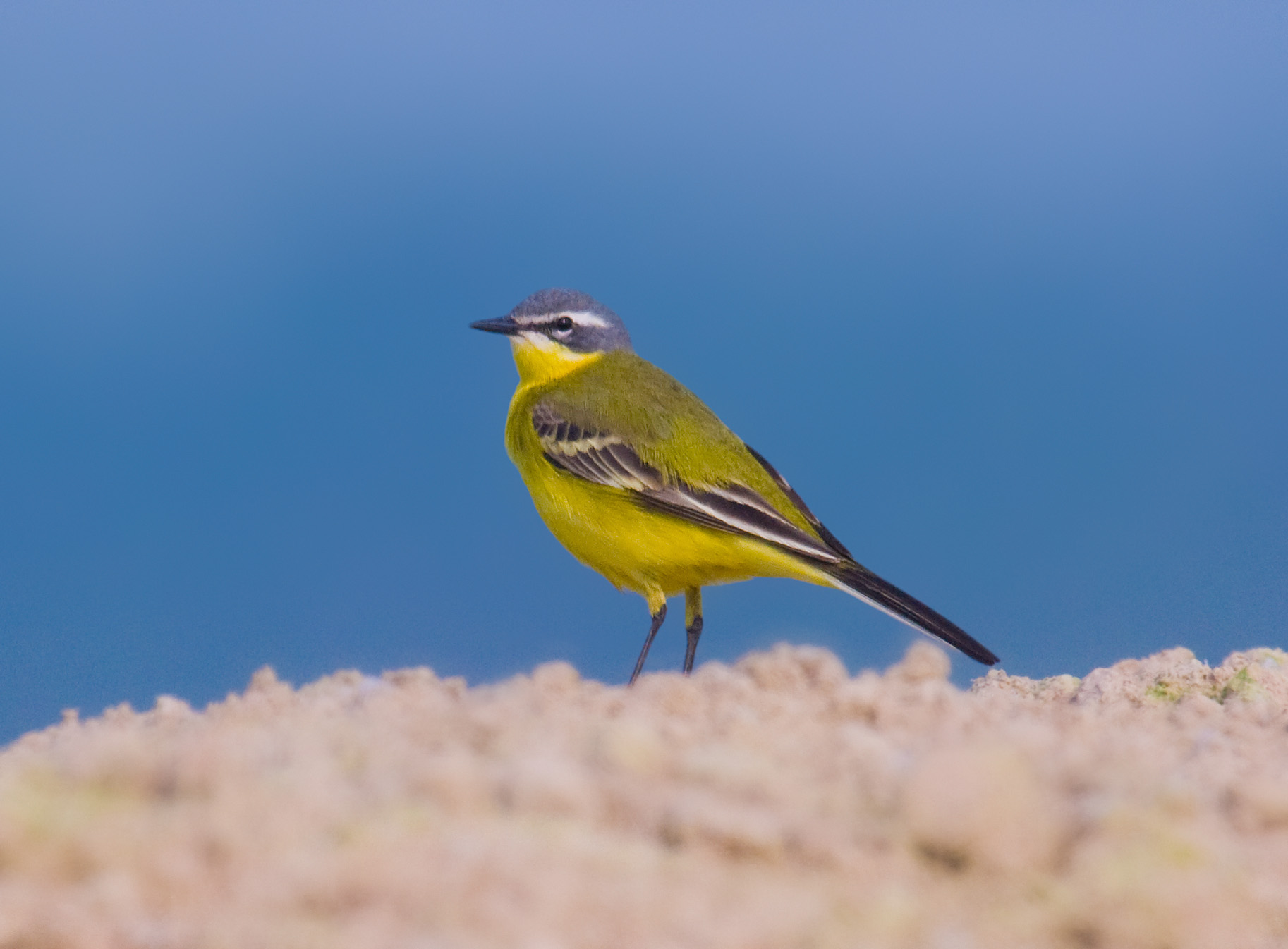
Yellow wagtail

Motacillidae is a family of small passerine birds with medium to long tails. They include the wagtails, longclaws and pipits. They are slender, ground feeding insectivores of open country.

- Forest wagtail, Dendronanthus indicus (A)
- Gray wagtail, Motacilla cinerea
- Western yellow wagtail, Motacilla flava
- Citrine wagtail, Motacilla citreola
- White-browed wagtail, Motacilla maderaspatensis
- White wagtail, Motacilla alba
- Richard's pipit, Anthus richardi
- Paddyfield pipit, Anthus rufulus
- Long-billed pipit, Anthus similis
- Blyth's pipit, Anthus godlewskii
- Tawny pipit, Anthus campestris
- Upland pipit, Anthus sylvanus
- Meadow pipit, Anthus pratensis
- Rosy pipit, Anthus roseatus
- Tree pipit, Anthus trivialis
- Olive-backed pipit, Anthus hodgsoni
- Red-throated pipit, Anthus cervinus
- Water pipit, Anthus spinoletta
- American pipit, Anthus rubescens

== Finches, euphonias, and allies ==
Order: Passeriformes Family: Fringillidae

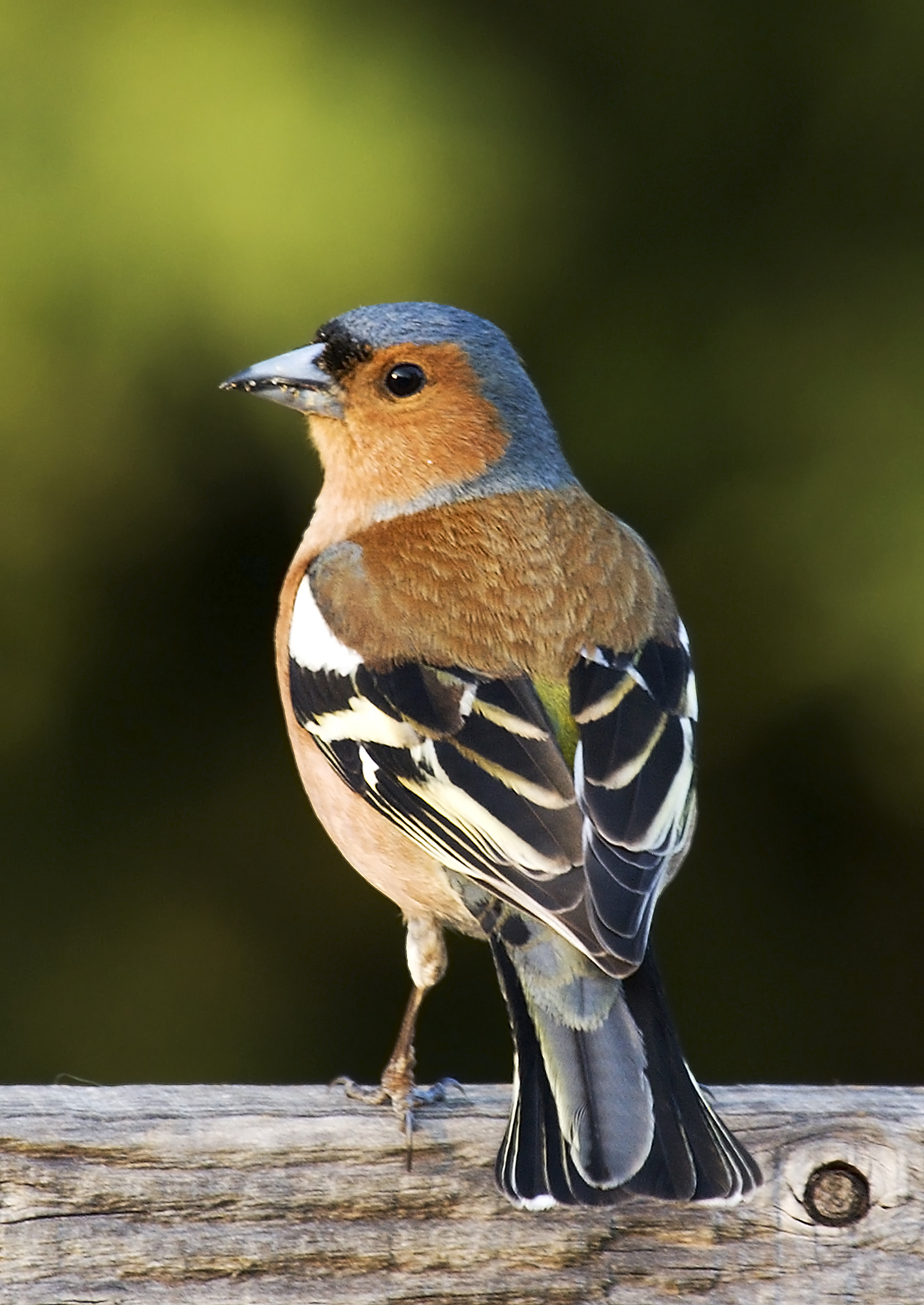
Common chaffinch

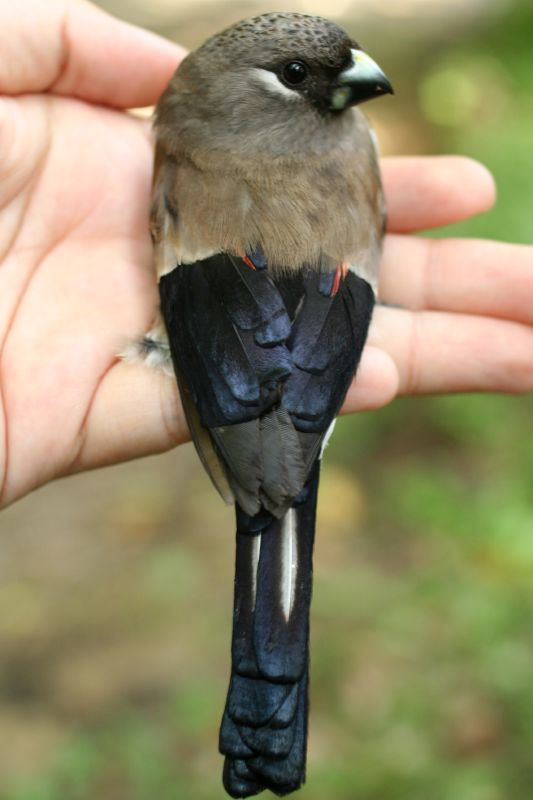
Brown bullfinch

Finches are seed-eating passerine birds, that are small to moderately large and have a strong beak, usually conical and in some species very large. All have twelve tail feathers and nine primaries. These birds have a bouncing flight with alternating bouts of flapping and gliding on closed wings, and most sing well.

- Common chaffinch, Fringilla coelebs
- Brambling, Fringilla montifringilla
- Black-and-yellow grosbeak, Mycerobas icterioides
- Collared grosbeak, Mycerobas affinis
- Spot-winged grosbeak, Mycerobas melanozanthos
- White-winged grosbeak, Mycerobas carnipes
- Hawfinch, Coccothraustes coccothraustes
- Common rosefinch, Carpodacus erythrinus
- Blyth's rosefinch, Carpodacus grandis
- Pink-browed rosefinch, Carpodacus rhodochrous
- Streaked rosefinch, Carpodacus rubicilloides
- Great rosefinch, Carpodacus rubicilla
- Red-fronted rosefinch, Carpodacus puniceus
- Himalayan white-browed rosefinch, Carpodacus thura
- Brown bullfinch, Pyrrhula nipalensis
- Orange bullfinch, Pyrrhula aurantiaca
- Crimson-winged finch, Rhodopechys sanguineus
- Trumpeter finch, Bucanetes githagineus
- Mongolian finch, Bucanetes mongolicus
- Spectacled finch, Callacanthis burtoni
- Dark-breasted rosefinch, Procarduelis nipalensis
- Plain mountain finch, Leucosticte nemoricola
- Black-headed mountain finch, Leucosticte brandti
- Desert finch, Rhodospiza obsoleta
- European greenfinch, Chloris chloris (V)
- Yellow-breasted greenfinch, Chloris spinoides
- Twite, Linaria flavirostris
- Eurasian linnet, Linaria cannabina
- Red crossbill, Loxia curvirostra
- European goldfinch, Carduelis carduelis
- Fire-fronted serin, Serinus pusillus
- Eurasian siskin, Spinus spinus (V)

== Old World buntings ==
Order: Passeriformes Family: Emberizidae

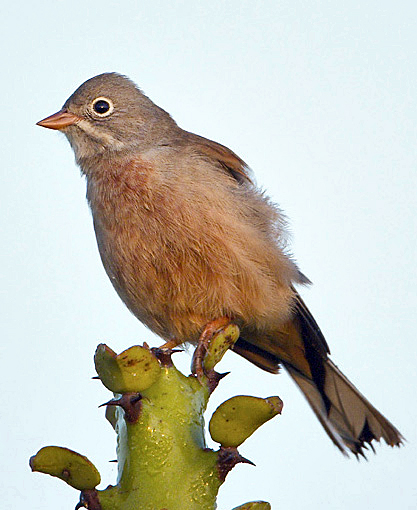
Gray-necked bunting

The emberizids are a large family of passerine birds. They are seed-eating birds with distinctively shaped bills. Many emberizid species have distinctive head patterns.

- Crested bunting, Emberiza lathami
- Black-headed bunting, Emberiza melanocephala
- Red-headed bunting, Emberiza bruniceps
- Corn bunting, Emberiza calandra
- Chestnut-eared bunting, Emberiza fucata
- Rock bunting, Emberiza cia
- Godlewski's bunting, Emberiza godlewskii
- Meadow bunting, Emberiza cioides (V)
- White-capped bunting, Emberiza stewarti
- Yellowhammer, Emberiza citrinella (V)
- Pine bunting, Emberiza leucocephalos
- Gray-necked bunting, Emberiza buchanani
- Ortolan bunting, Emberiza hortulana (V)
- Striolated bunting, Emberiza striolata
- Reed bunting, Emberiza schoeniclus
- Yellow-breasted bunting, Emberiza aureola
- Little bunting, Emberiza pusilla
- Chestnut bunting, Emberiza rutila

== See also ==
- List of birds
- Lists of birds by region
- Birds of Islamabad
