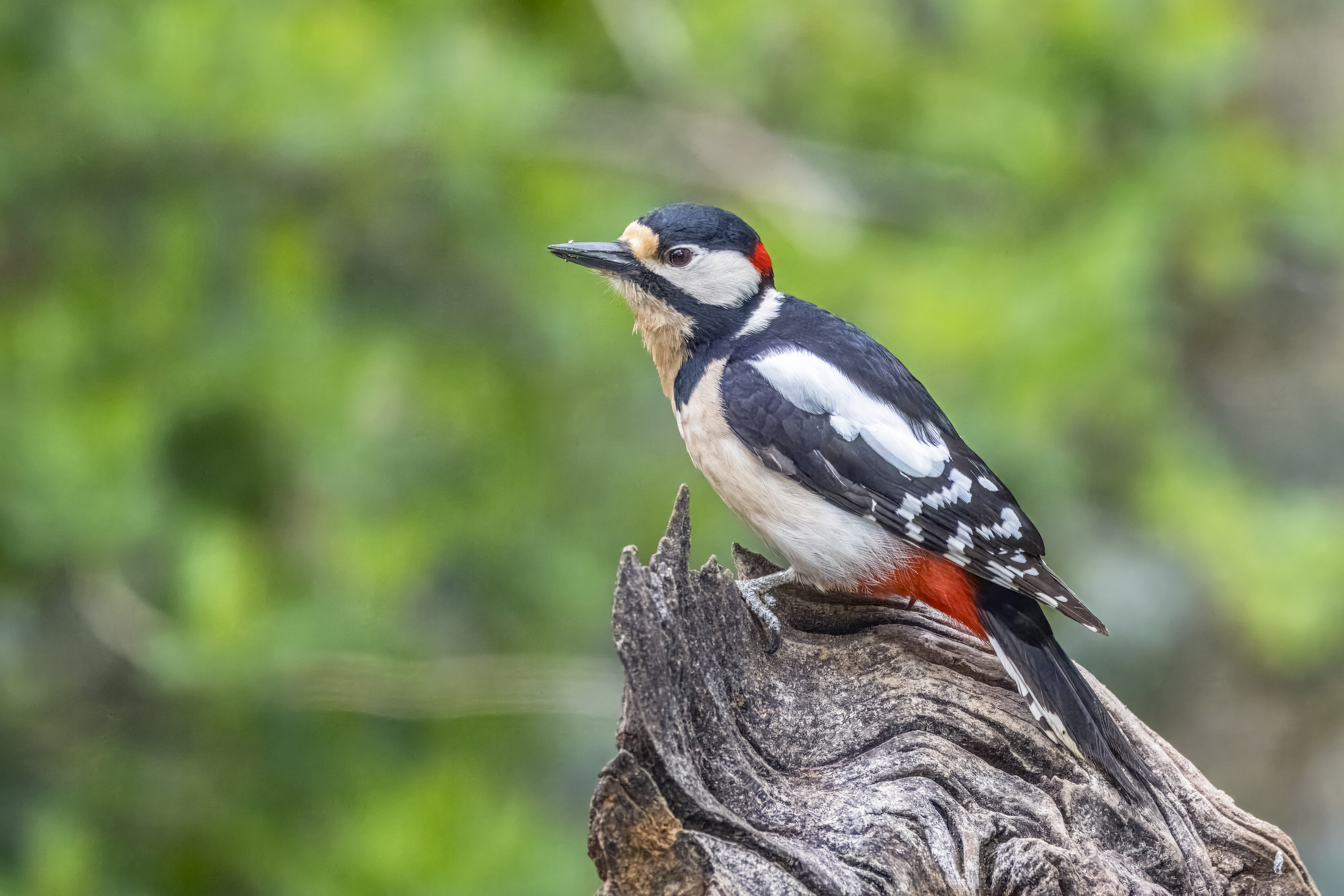
- Male
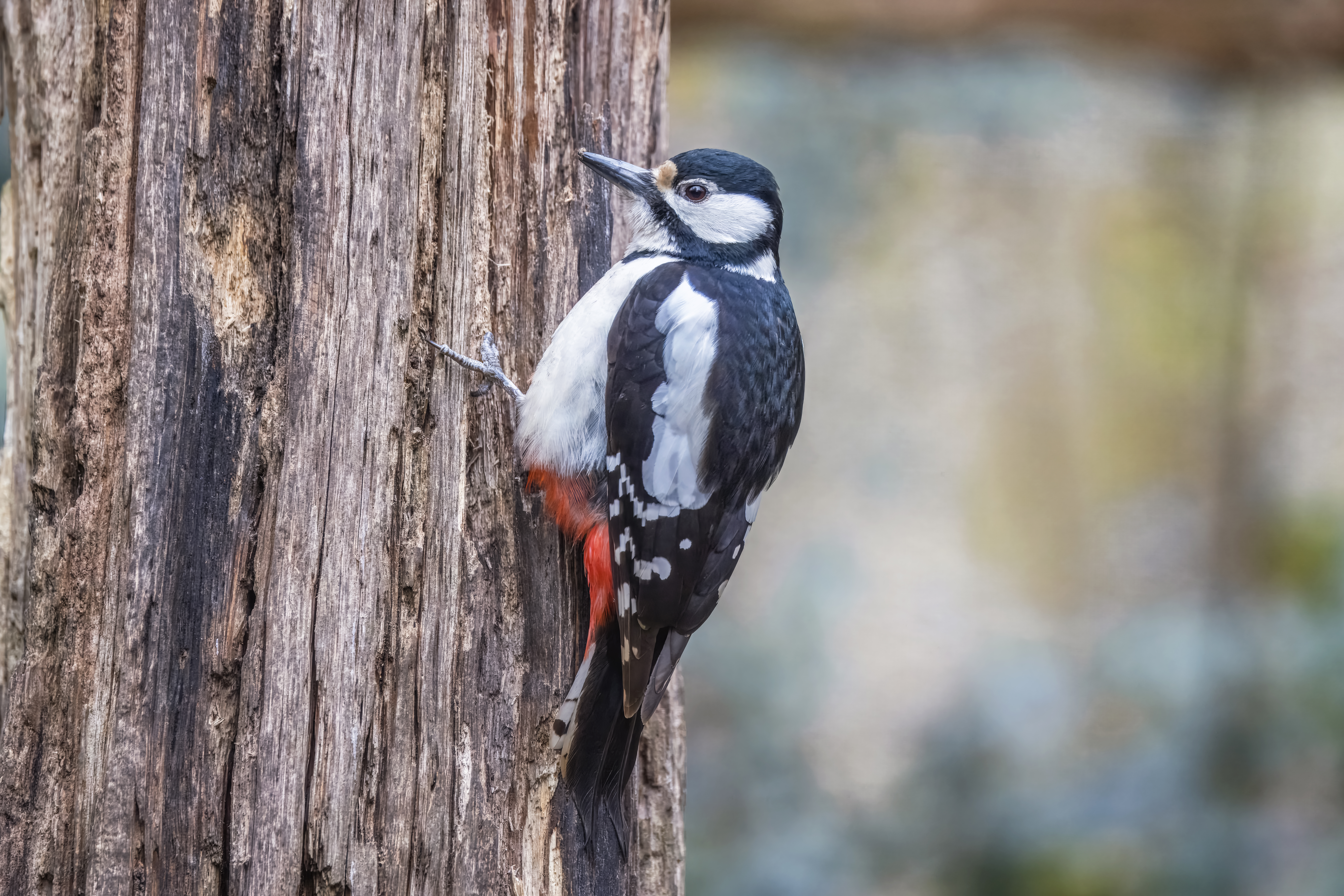
- Female both in the Netherlands

Conservation status
- Least Concern (IUCN 3.1)

Scientific classification
- Kingdom: Animalia
- Phylum: Chordata
- Class: Aves
- Order: Piciformes
- Family: Picidae
- Genus: Dendrocopos
- Species: D. major

Binomial name
- Dendrocopos major (Linnaeus, 1758)
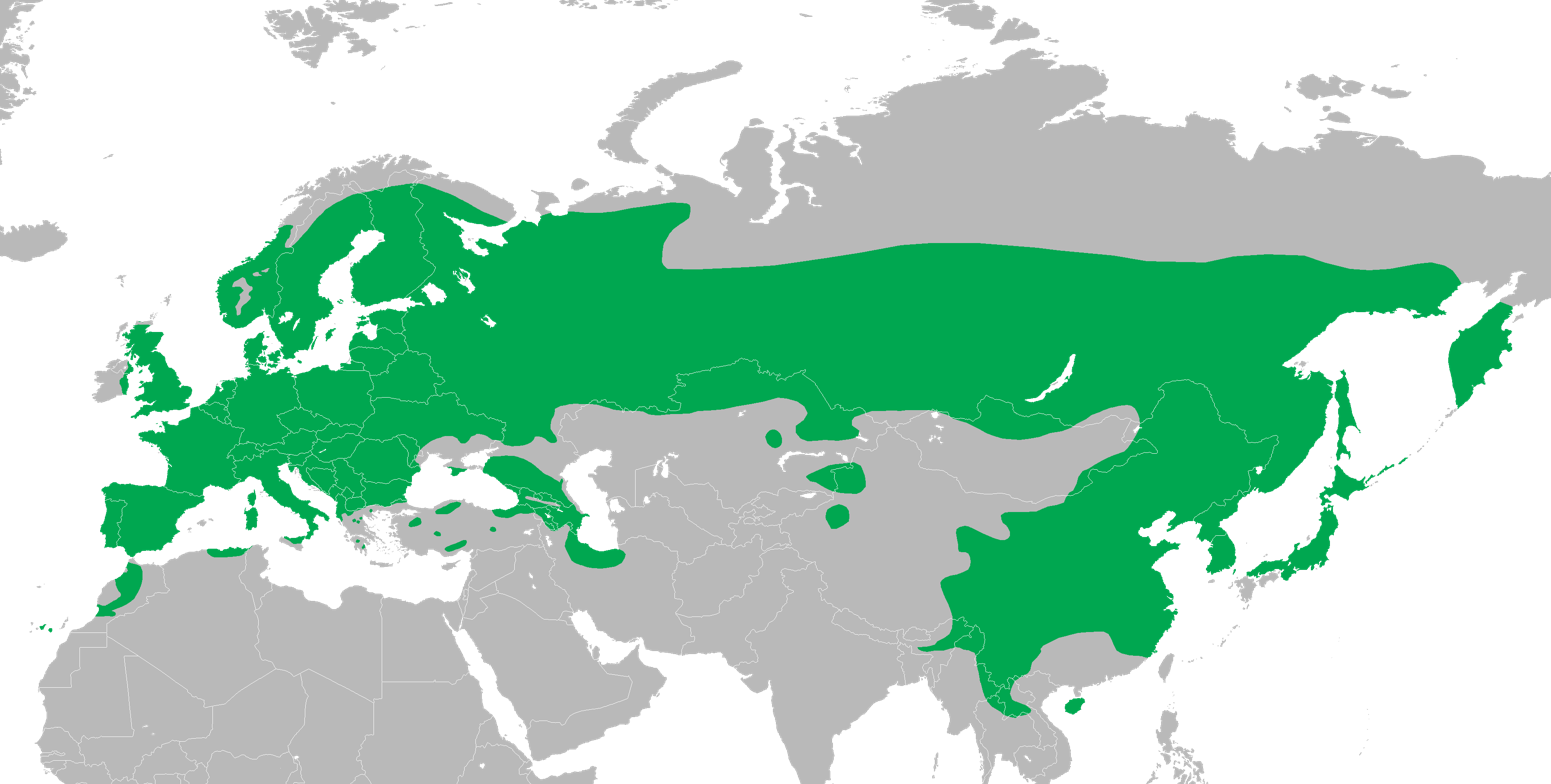

Synonyms
- Picus major Linnaeus, 1758

Audio
- Drumming recorded in Devon, England

= Great spotted woodpecker =

Species of bird

The great spotted woodpecker (Dendrocopos major) is a medium-sized woodpecker with pied black and white plumage and a red patch on the lower belly. Males and young birds also have red markings on the neck or head. This species is found across the Palearctic including parts of North Africa. Across most of its range it is resident, but in the north some will migrate if the conifer cone crop fails. Some individuals have a tendency to wander, leading to the recolonisation of Ireland in the first decade of the 21st century and to vagrancy to North America. Great spotted woodpeckers chisel into trees to find food or excavate nest holes, and also drum for contact and territorial advertisement; like other woodpeckers, they have anatomical adaptations to manage the physical stresses from the hammering action.

This woodpecker occurs in all types of woodlands and eats a variety of foods, being capable of extracting seeds from pine cones, insect larvae from inside trees or eggs and chicks of other birds from their nests. It breeds in holes excavated in living or dead trees, unlined apart from wood chips. The typical clutch is four to six glossy white eggs. Both parents incubate the eggs, feed the chicks, and keep the nest clean. When the young fledge they are fed by the adults for about ten days, each parent taking responsibility for feeding part of the brood.

The species is closely related to some other members of its genus. It has a number of subspecies, some of which are distinctive enough to be potential new species. It has a huge range and large population, with no widespread threats, so it is classed as a species of least concern by the International Union for Conservation of Nature (IUCN).

== Taxonomy ==
Woodpeckers are an ancient bird family consisting of three subfamilies, the wrynecks, the piculets and the true woodpeckers, Picinae. The largest of the five tribes within the Picinae is Melanerpini, the pied woodpeckers, a group which includes the great spotted woodpecker. Within the genus Dendrocopos the great spotted woodpecker's closest relatives are the Himalayan, Sind, Syrian, white-winged woodpeckers and the Darjeeling woodpecker. The great spotted woodpecker has been recorded as hybridising with the Syrian woodpecker.

The great spotted woodpecker was described by Carl Linnaeus in his landmark 1758 10th edition of Systema Naturae as Picus major. It was moved to its current genus, Dendrocopos, by the German naturalist Carl Ludwig Koch in 1816. The genus name Dendrocopos is a combination of the Greek words dendron, "tree", and kopos, "striking". The specific major is from Latin maior, "greater".

=== Subspecies ===
Recognised subspecies vary by author from as few as 14 to nearly 30. This is largely because changes are clinal with many intermediate forms. However, mitochondrial DNA data suggests that the Caspian Sea region's Dendrocopos major poelzami, Japanese D. m. japonicus and Chinese D. m. cabanisi may all merit full species status. Despite its distinctive appearance, D. m. canariensis from Tenerife in the Canary Islands appears to be closely related to the nominate subspecies D. m. major.

The fossil subspecies D. m. submajor lived during the Middle Pleistocene Riss glaciation (250,000 to 300,000 years ago) when it was found in Europe south of the ice sheet. It is sometimes treated as a distinct species, but did not differ significantly from the extant great spotted woodpecker, whose European subspecies are probably its direct descendants.

== Description ==
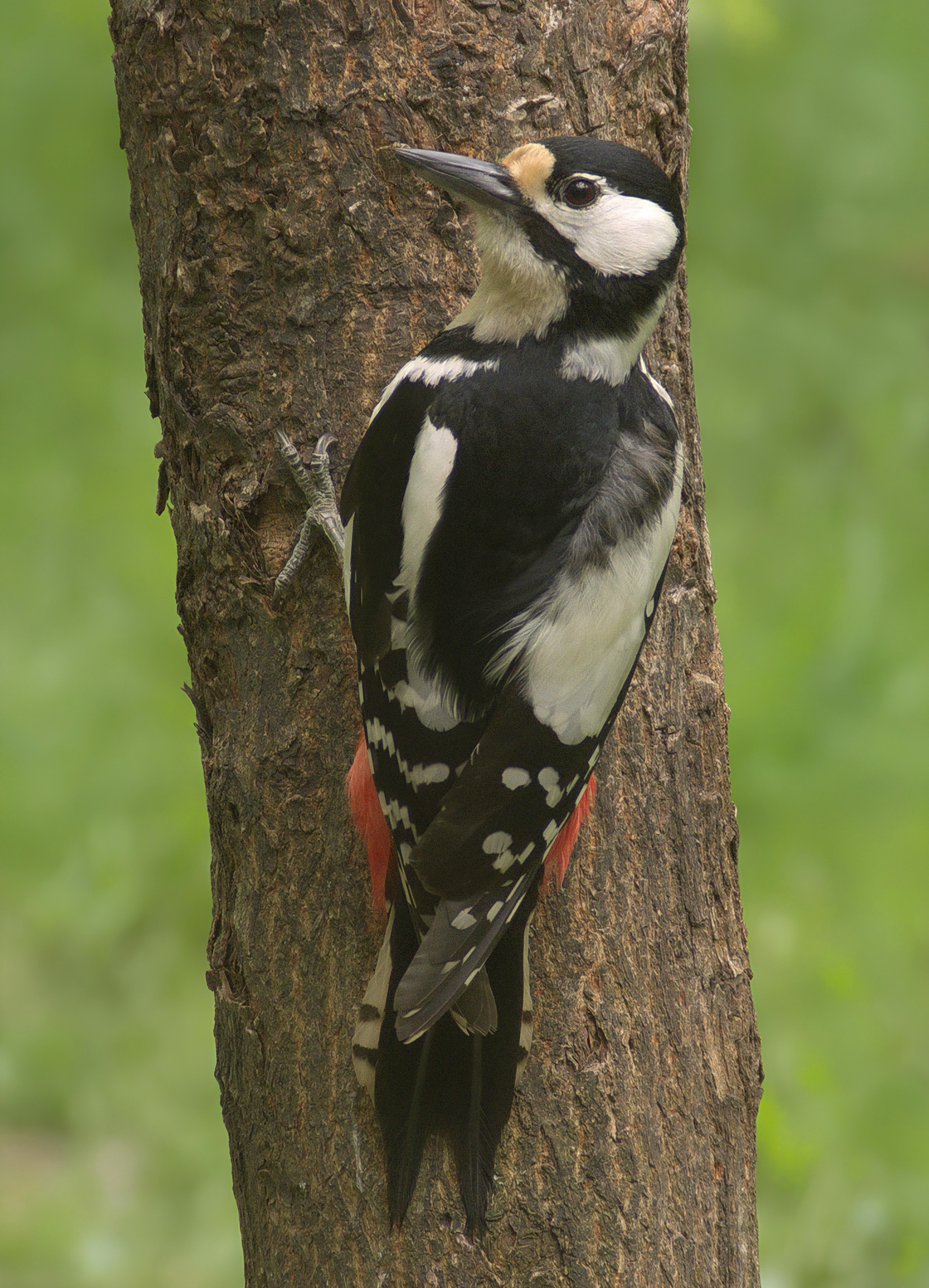
Female Dendrocopos major major

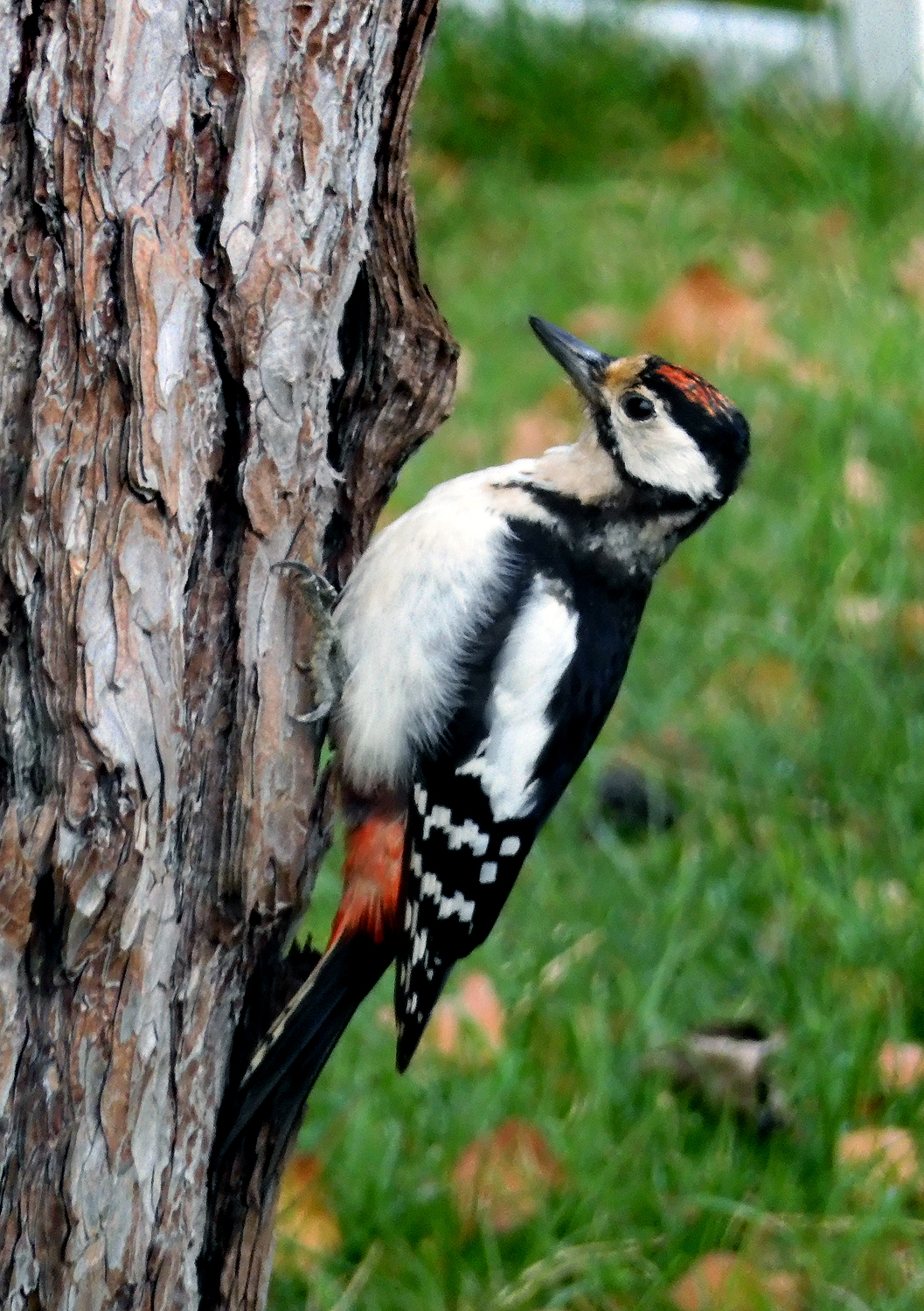
A juvenile male foraging on a pine tree in Ystad.

An adult great spotted woodpecker is 20–24 cm (7.9–9.4 in) long, weighs 70–98 g (2.5–3.5 oz) and has a 34–39 cm (13–15 in) wingspan. The upperparts are glossy blue-black, with white on the sides of the face and neck. Black lines run from the shoulder to the nape, the base of the bill and about halfway across the breast. There is a large white shoulder patch and the flight feathers are barred with black and white, as is the tail. The underparts are white other than a scarlet lower belly and undertail. The bill is slate-black, the legs greenish-grey and the eye is deep red. Males have a crimson patch on the nape, which is absent from the otherwise similar females. Juvenile birds are less glossy than adults and have a brown tinge to their upperparts and dirty white underparts. Their markings are less well-defined than the adult's and the lower belly is pink rather than red. The crown of the juvenile's head is red, less extensively in young females than males.

The various subspecies differ in plumage, the general pattern being that northern forms are larger, heavier-billed and whiter beneath, as predicted by Bergmann's rule, so north Eurasian D. m. major and D. m. kamtschaticus are large and strikingly white, whereas D. m. hispanicus in Iberia and D. m. harterti in Corsica and Sardinia are somewhat smaller and have darker underparts. D. m. canariensis and D. m. thanneri in the Canary Islands are similar to the Iberian race but have contrasting white flanks. In Morocco, D. m. mauritanus is pale below with red in the centre of its breast, and birds breeding at higher altitudes are larger and darker than those lower in the hills. D. m. numidus in Algeria and Tunisia is very distinctive, with a breast band of red-tipped black feathers. Caspian D. m. poelzami is small, relatively long-billed and has brown underparts. D. m. japonicus of Japan has less white on its shoulders but more in its wings. The two Chinese forms, D. m. cabanisi and D. m. stresemanni, have brownish heads and underparts, and often some red on the breast. Both races have increasingly dark underparts towards the south of their respective ranges.

Some other species in its genus are similar to the great spotted woodpecker. The Syrian woodpecker lacks its relative's black cheek bar and has whiter underparts and paler red underparts, although juvenile great spotted woodpeckers often have an incomplete cheek bar, so can potentially be misidentified as Syrian. The white-winged woodpecker has a far more extensive white wing patch than the great spotted woodpecker. The Sind woodpecker is very similar to the Syrian species, and can be distinguished from great spotted woodpecker in the same way.

=== Moult ===
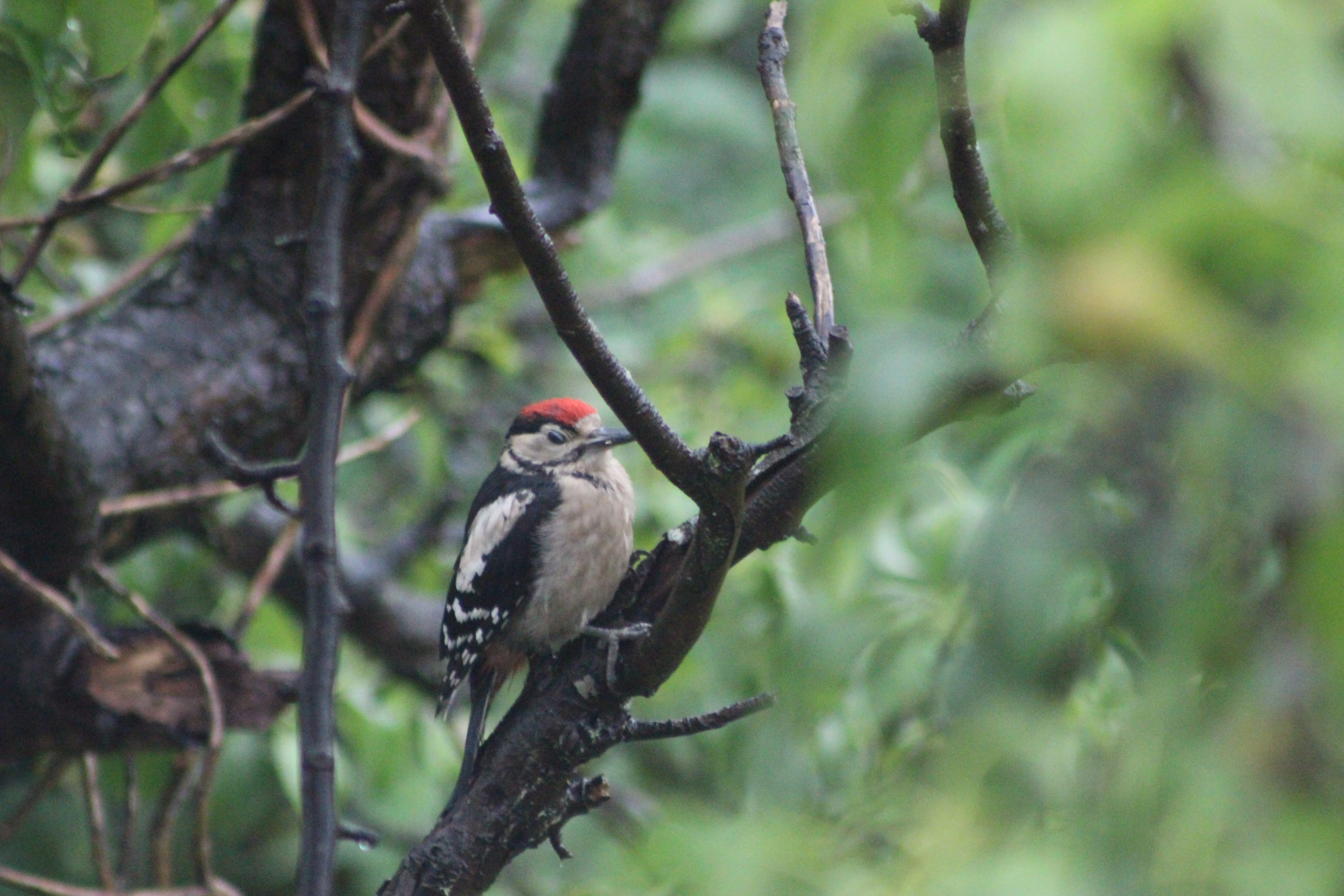
Juvenile male D. m. major in Maidenhead, Berkshire, England. Juveniles can be distinguished from adults by their red crown, which is more pronounced in males.

Adult great spotted woodpeckers have a complete moult after the breeding season which takes about 120 days. Northern D. m. major starts its moult from mid-June to late July and finishes in October or November, temperate races like D. m. pinetorum are earlier, commencing in early June to mid-July and completing in mid-September to late October, and southern D. m. hispanicus starts late May or June and finishes as early as August. Juveniles have a partial moult, retaining some of the wing coverts but replacing body, tail and primary feathers. This moult to near-adult plumage starts from late May to early August and finishes from mid-September to late November, timing varying with latitude as with the adults.

=== Voice ===
The call of the great spotted woodpecker is a sharp kik, which may be repeated as a wooden rattling krrarraarr if the bird is disturbed. The courtship call, gwig, is mostly given in the display flight. Drumming on dead trees and branches, and sometimes suitable man-made structures, serves to maintain contact between paired adults and to advertise ownership of territory.

Drumming

Both sexes drum, although the male does so much more often, mostly from mid-January until the young are fledged. The far-carrying drumming is faster than for any other woodpecker in its range at around 10–16 strikes per second, typically in one-second bursts, although repeated frequently. As late as the early twentieth century it was thought that the drumming might be a vocalisation, and it was not until 1943 that it was finally proved to be purely mechanical.

== Distribution and habitat ==
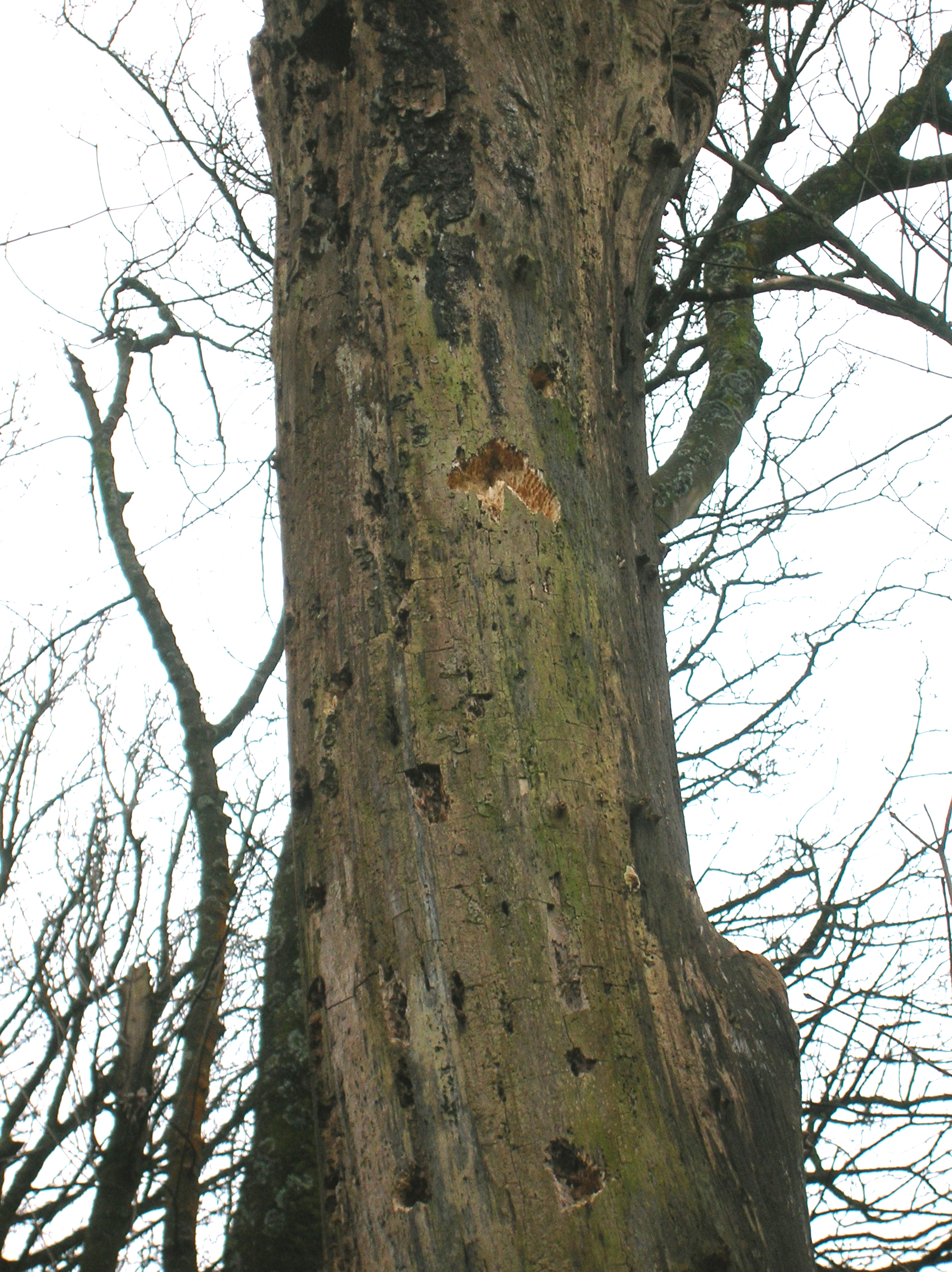
Large trees provide habitat for excavating feeding holes.

The species ranges across Eurasia from Ireland to Japan, and in North Africa from Morocco to Tunisia; it is absent only from those areas too cold or dry to have suitable woodland habitat. It is found in a wide variety of woodlands, broadleaf, coniferous or mixed, and in modified habitats like parks, gardens and olive groves. It occurs from sea level to the tree line, up to 2,000 m (6,600 ft) in Europe, 2,200 m (7,200 ft) in Morocco and 2,500 m (8,200 ft) in Central Asia.

The great spotted woodpecker is mainly resident year-round, but sizeable movements can occur when there are shortages of pine and spruce cones in the north of the range. Highland populations often descend to lower altitudes in winter. Juveniles also have a tendency to wander some distance from where they were hatched, often as far as 100–600 km (60–400 mi), sometimes up to 3,000 km (1,900 mi). Vagrants have reached the Faroe Islands, Hong Kong and Iceland, and there are several sightings from North America in at least the Aleutian Islands, Pribilof Islands and Alaska.

Due to deforestation, this woodpecker was extirpated in Ireland in the seventeenth century, but the island has been naturally recolonised, with the first proven nesting in County Down in 2007. Its expansion in range is continuing, with breeding proven or suspected in at least 10 counties by 2013, with the main concentration in Down and County Wicklow, and by 2021 had reached all counuties but Mayo. Genetic evidence shows the birds to be of British, rather than Scandinavian, ancestry, with the populations in Ireland and Northern Ireland having separate origins. The great spotted woodpecker was also found to have been nesting in the Isle of Man from 2009, and breeding from 2010.

== Behaviour ==
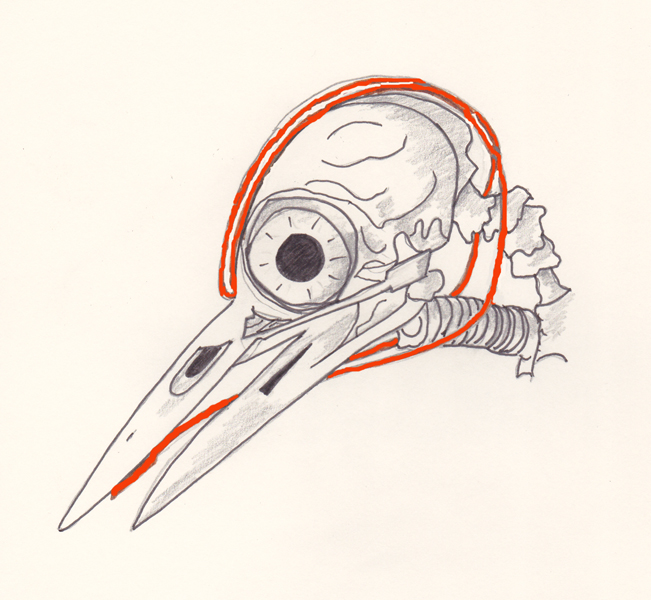
Skull showing tongue and supporting structures.

The great spotted woodpecker spends much of its time climbing trees, and has adaptations to this lifestyle, many of which are shared by other woodpecker species. These include the zygodactyl arrangement of the foot, with two toes facing forward and two back, and the stiff tail feathers that are used as a prop against the trunk. In most birds the bones of the tail diminish in size towards its end, but this does not occur in woodpeckers, and the final vertebra, the pygostyle, is very large to anchor the strong tail muscles.

The hammering of woodpeckers when drumming or feeding creates great forces which are potentially damaging to the birds. In the great spotted woodpecker and most of its relatives, the hinge where the front of the skull connects with the upper mandible is folded inwards, tensioned by a muscle that braces it against the shock of the impact when the bill is hammering on hard wood. The outer layer of the upper mandible is significantly longer than the more rigid lower mandible and absorbs much of the concussive force. Skeletal adaptations and strengthening also help to absorb the shock, and narrow nostrils protect against flying debris.

As well as using holes for breeding, great spotted woodpeckers roost at night, and sometimes during the day, in old nest cavities, excavated by other woodpeckers. They will occasionally make a new roosting hole or use an artificial site such as a nest box.

=== Breeding ===
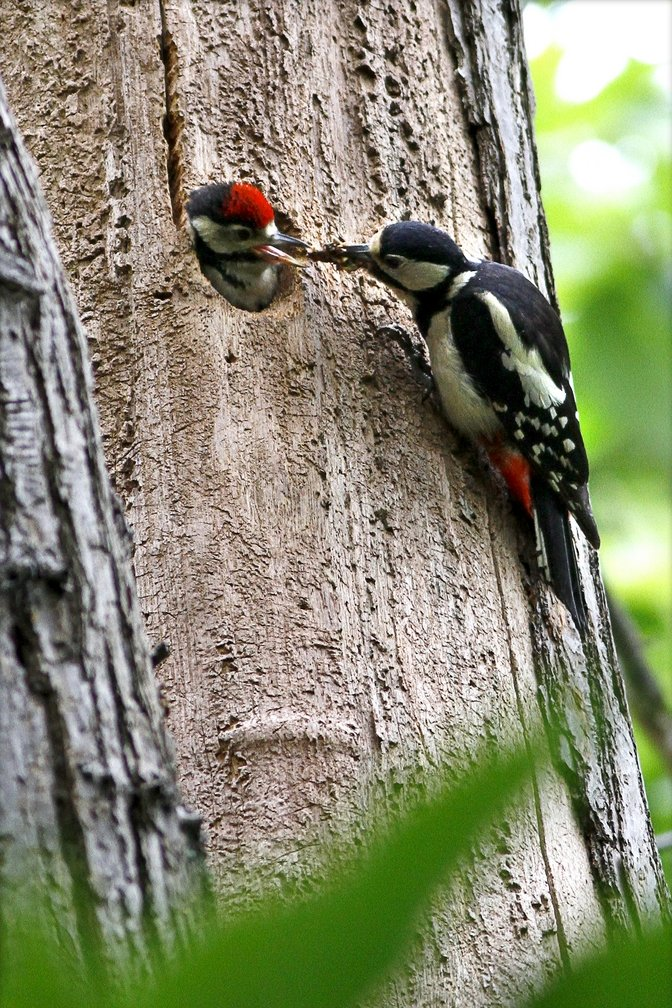
Female feeding juvenile

Great spotted woodpeckers are strongly territorial, typically occupying areas of about 5 ha (12 acres) year-round, which are defended mainly by the male, a behaviour which attracts females. Pairs are monogamous during the breeding period, but often change partners before the next season.

Sexual maturity is attained at an age of one year; courtship behaviour commences in the following December. The male has a fluttering flight display with shallow wingbeats and a spread tail. He calls in flight and may land at a prospective nest-site. The female may initiate mating and will occasionally mount the male, this reverse mounting typically preceding normal copulation.

The pair excavate a new hole at least 0.3 m (1 ft) above the ground and usually lower than 8 m (26 ft), although sometimes much higher. The chosen site is normally a tree, alive or dead, occasionally a utility pole or nest box. Old holes are rarely re-used, although the same tree may be used for nesting for several years. The nest cavity is 25–35 cm (9.8–13.8 in) deep with an entrance hole 5–6 cm (2.0–2.4 in) wide. It is excavated by both sexes, the male doing most of the chiselling. As with other woodpeckers, the hole is unlined, although wood chips from the excavation may cover the base of the cavity.

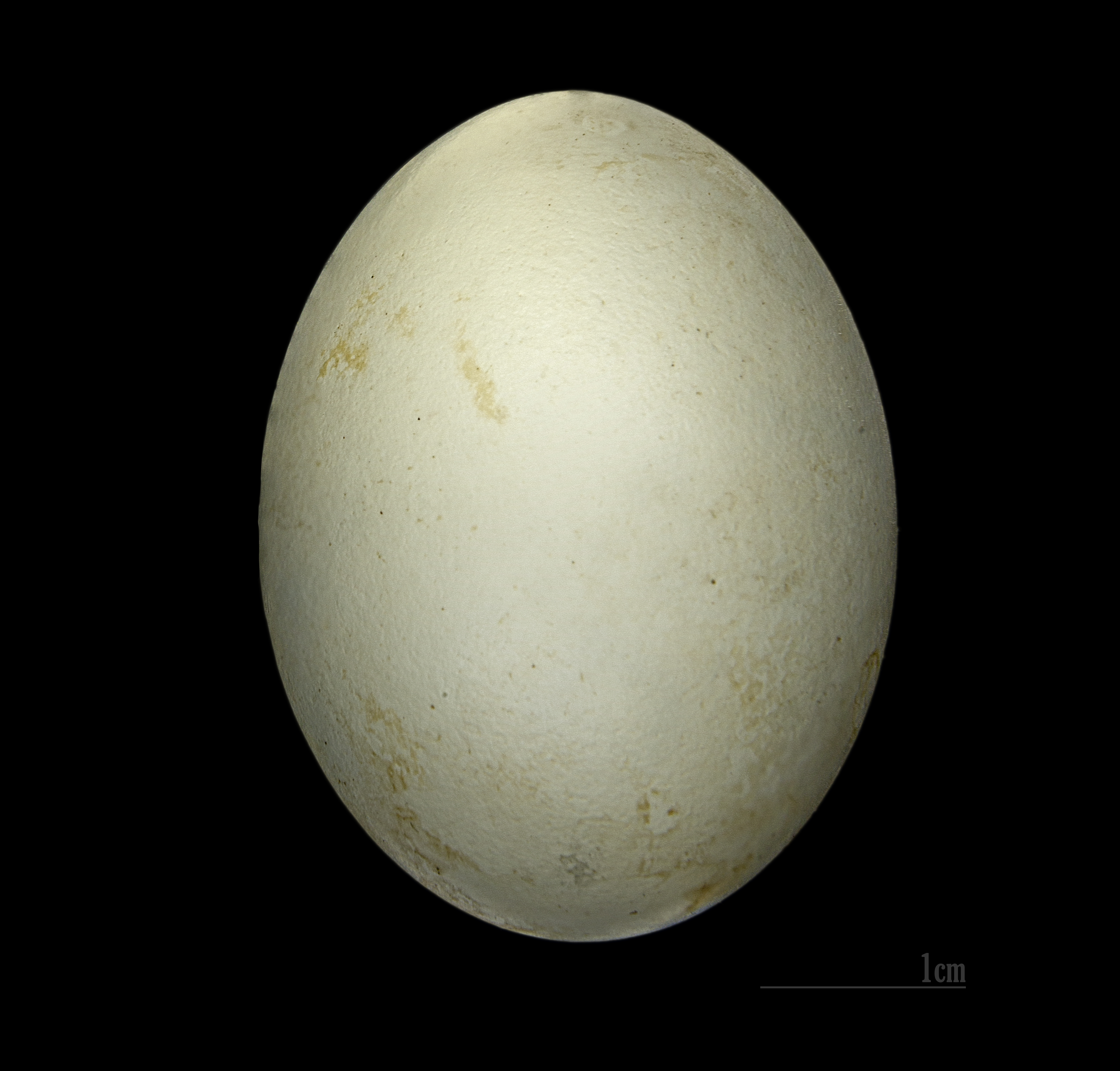
Egg

Trees chosen for nest holes have soft heartwood and tough sapwood, the former often due to parasites or diseases that weaken the tree's core. It is not certain how suitable trees are selected, although it may be by drumming, since woods with differing elastic modulus and density may transmit sound at different speeds. A Japanese study found nests in trees from many families; these included grey alder, Japanese white birch, Japanese hop-hornbeam, Japanese tree lilac, willows, Japanese larch and Sargent's cherry. The Mongolian oak and prickly castor-oil tree were rarely if ever used.

The typical clutch is four to six glossy white eggs that measure 27 mm × 20 mm (1.06 in × 0.79 in) and weigh about 5.7 g (0.20 oz), of which 7% is shell. They are laid from mid-April to June, the later dates being for birds breeding in the north of the range or at altitude. The eggs are incubated by either adult during the day and by the male at night, for 10–12 days before hatching. Both birds brood and feed the altricial naked chicks and keep the nest clean. The young fledge in 20–23 days from hatching. Each parent then takes responsibility for feeding part of the brood for about ten days, during which time they normally remain close to the nest tree.

There is only one brood per year. The survival rates for adults and young are unknown, as is the average lifespan, but the maximum known age is just over 11 years.

=== Feeding ===
Male and female feeding young

The great spotted woodpecker is omnivorous. It digs beetle larvae from trees and also takes many other invertebrates including adult beetles, ants and spiders. The bird also digs for Lepidoptera larvae like Acronicta rumicis. Crustaceans, molluscs and carrion may be eaten, and bird feeders are visited for seeds, suet and domestic scraps. The nests of other cavity-nesting birds, such as tits, may be raided for their eggs and chicks; nest boxes may be similarly attacked, holes being pecked to admit entrance by the woodpecker where necessary. House martin colonies can be destroyed in repeated visits.

Fat-rich plant products such as nuts and conifer seeds are particularly important as winter food in the north of the woodpecker's range, and can then supply more than 30% of the bird's energy requirements. Other plant items consumed include buds, berries and tree sap, the latter obtained by drilling rings of holes around a tree trunk.

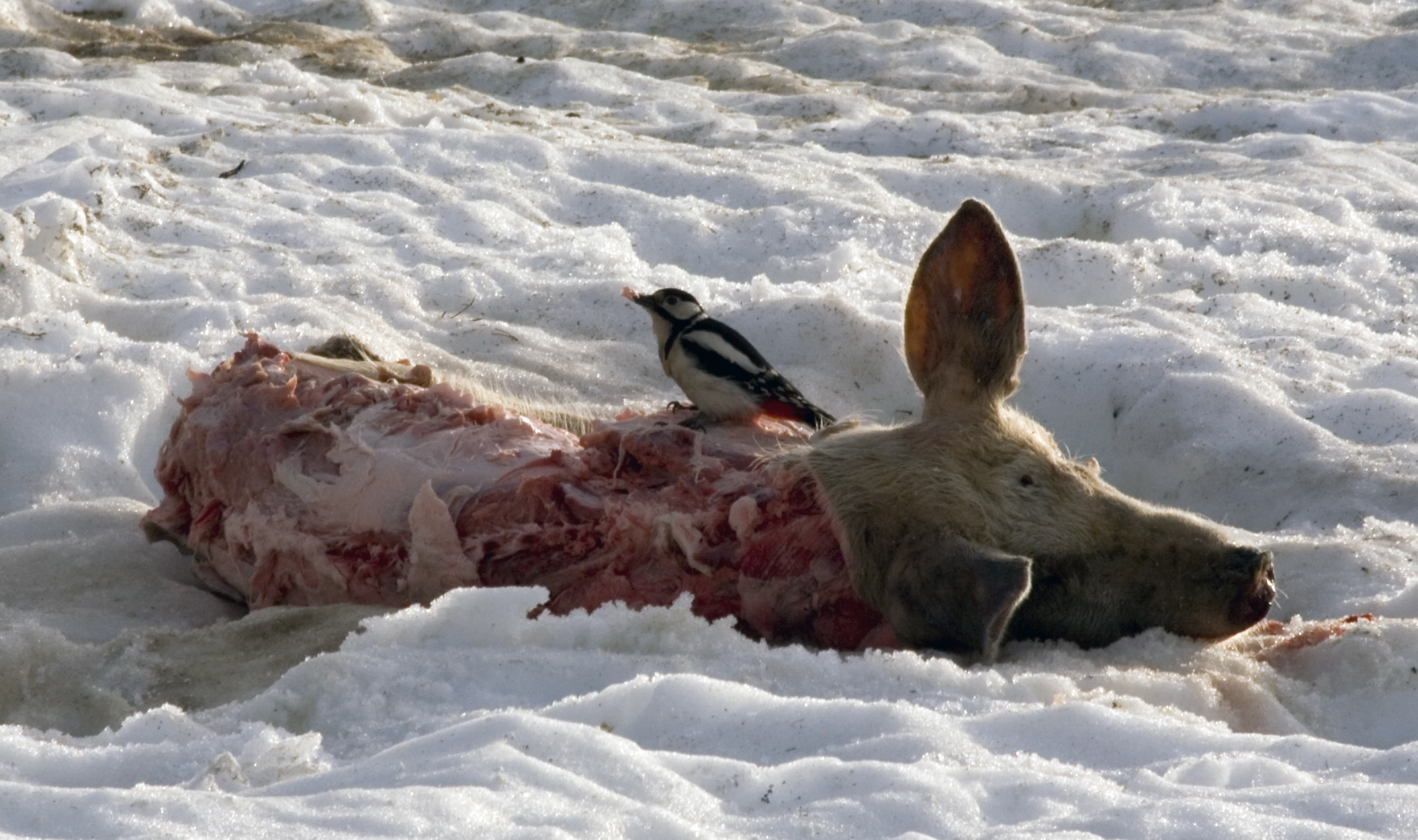
Scavenging on a dead pig

The species feeds at all levels of a tree, usually alone, but sometimes as a pair. It will use an "anvil" on which to hammer hard items, particularly pine, spruce, and larch cones, but also fruit, nuts, and hard-bodied insects.

Easily accessible items are picked off the tree surface or from fissures in the bark, but larvae are extracted by chiselling holes up to 10 cm (3.9 in) deep and trapping the soft insect with the tongue, which can extend to 40 mm (1.6 in) beyond the bill, and is covered with bristles and sticky saliva to trap the prey. The woodpecker is able to extend its tongue so far because the hyoid bone to which it is attached has long flexible "horns" that wind around the skull and can move forward when required.

=== Predators and parasites ===
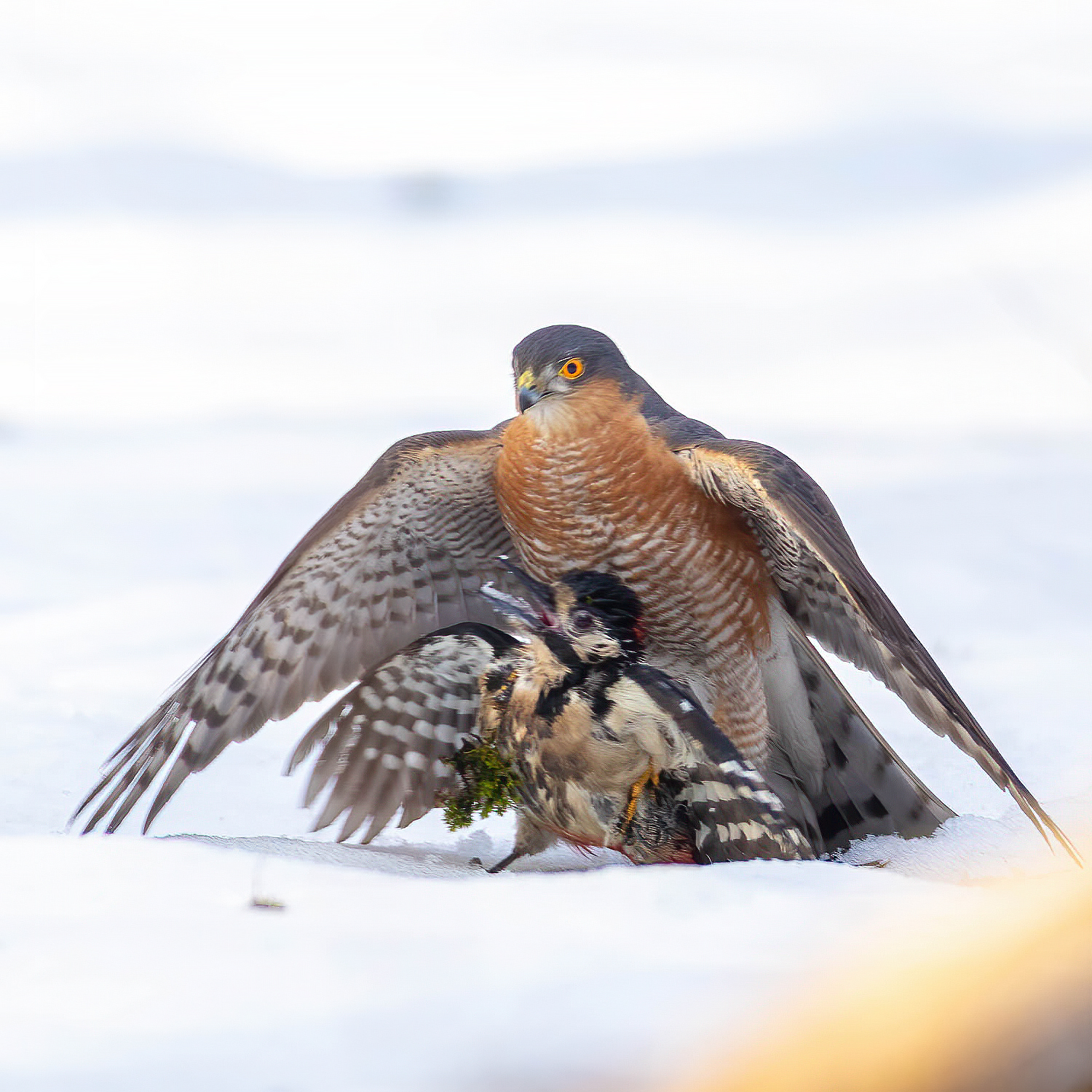
Male caught by a male Eurasian sparrowhawk, in Moscow

Woodland birds of prey such as the Eurasian sparrowhawk and the Eurasian goshawk hunt the great spotted woodpecker. This woodpecker is a host of the blood-feeding fly Carnus hemapterus, and its internal parasites may include the spiny-headed worm Prosthorhynchus transversus. Protozoans also occur, including the potentially fatal Toxoplasma gondii, which causes toxoplasmosis. The great spotted woodpecker is the favoured host of the tapeworm Anomotaenia brevis.

== Status ==
The total population for the great spotted woodpecker is estimated at 73.7–110.3 million individuals, with 35% of the population in Europe. The breeding range is estimated as 57.8 million square kilometres (22.3 million sq mi), and the population is considered overall to be large and apparently stable or slightly increasing, especially in Britain, where the population has recently overspilled into Ireland. For this reason the great spotted woodpecker is evaluated as a species of least concern by the IUCN.

Breeding densities have been recorded as between 0.1 and 6.6 pairs/10 ha (0.04–2.7 pairs/10 acres), with the greatest densities in mature forest growing on alluvium. Numbers have increased in Europe due to the planting of forests, which provides breeding habitat, and more available dead wood, and this species has profited from its flexibility with regard to types of woodland and its ability to thrive in proximity to humans. Harsh winters are a problem, and fragmentation of woodland can cause local difficulties. The Canary Islands populations of the subspecies D. m. canariensis on Tenerife and D. m. thanneri on Gran Canaria face a potential threat from the exploitation of the local pine forests.

== Cited texts ==
- Gorman, Gerard (2014). Woodpeckers of the World. Helm Photographic Guides. London: Christopher Helm. ISBN 978-1-4081-4715-3.

== See also ==
- Lesser spotted woodpecker
