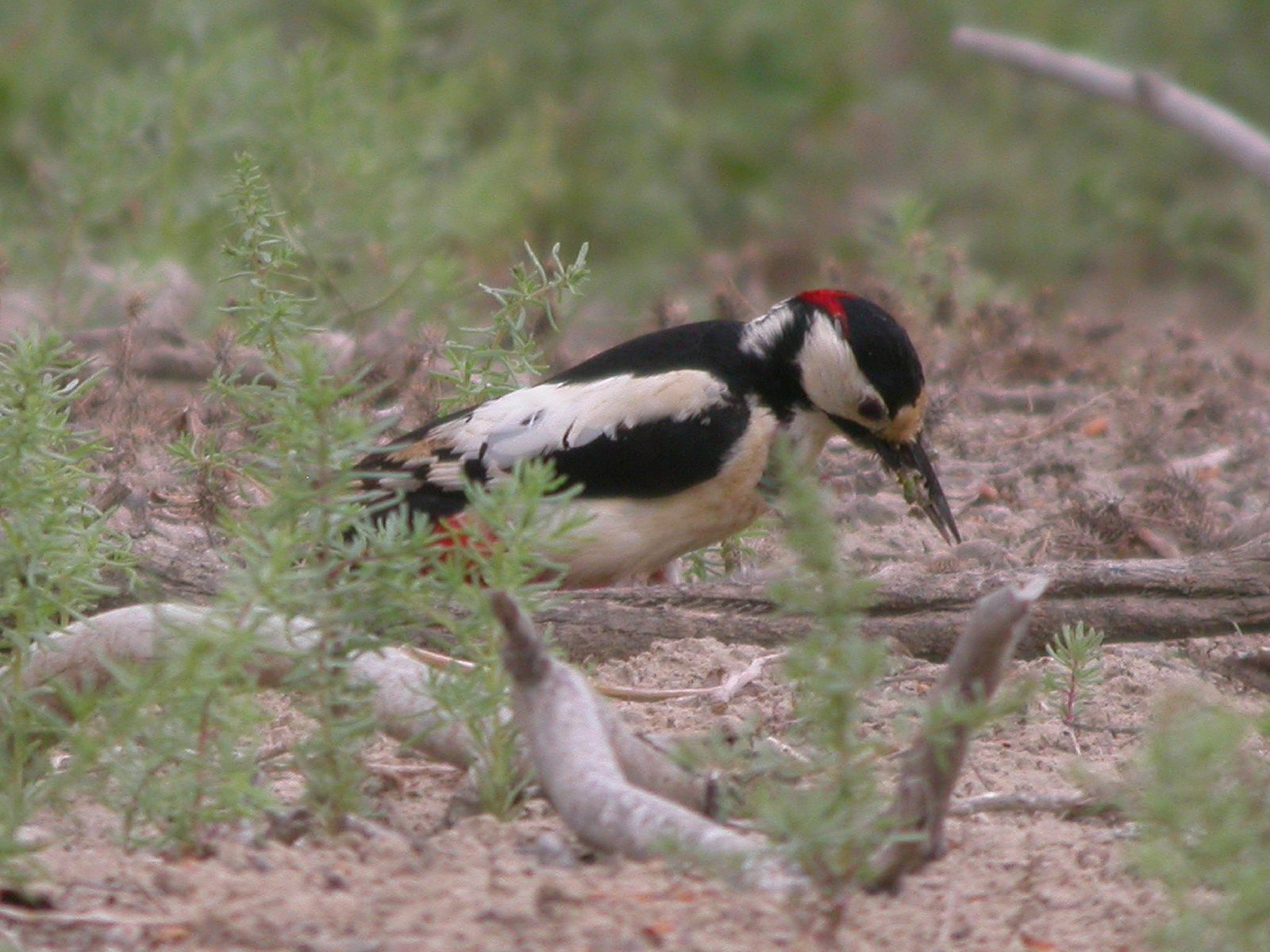

Conservation status
- Least Concern (IUCN 3.1)

Scientific classification
- Kingdom: Animalia
- Phylum: Chordata
- Class: Aves
- Order: Piciformes
- Family: Picidae
- Genus: Dendrocopos
- Species: D. leucopterus

Binomial name
- Dendrocopos leucopterus (Salvadori, 1871)

= White-winged woodpecker =

Species of bird

The white-winged woodpecker (Dendrocopos leucopterus) is a species of bird in the family Picidae. It is found in Afghanistan, China, Iran, Kazakhstan, Kyrgyzstan, Tajikistan, Turkmenistan, and Uzbekistan. The white-winged woodpecker's natural habitats are temperate forests and subtropical or tropical moist lowland forests. They are non-migratory.

These birds live at an elevation of 0–3,010 m (0–9,875 ft) above sea level. Their extent of occurrence is 3,300,000 km^{2} (820,000,000 acres)

While the species is common, over a span of ten years their major habitat, forested areas, has decreased in size by 1.1%, potentially leading to a 1–19% decrease in population size.

Their average lifespan is 2.8 years, though they have lived to almost eleven years. They become mature at around one year old. Their clutch size is five eggs.

== Etymology ==
The specific epithet, leucopterus, comes from the Ancient Greek λευκοπτερος (leucopterus), meaning "white-winged", which then derives from λευκος (leucos), meaning "white", and -πτερος (-pteros), meaning "winged", the latter of which further derives from πτερον (pteron), meaning "wing".

== Description ==
The dominant colors of both genders are white, grey, and black, though orange, beige, and yellow do appear. The females have more black than grey, while the males have almost equal proportions.

Their average weight is 67 grams (2.4 oz). The adult length from the beak tip to the end of the tail is 22–23 centimetres (8.7–9.1 in). Their wingspan is 25.28 centimetres (9.95 in). The length of their beak is 2.33 centimetres (0.92 in). The length of their legs is 2.3 centimetres (0.91 in).

Species that may appear similar are the great spotted woodpecker, Himalayan woodpecker, and Darjeeling Woodpecker, among others.
