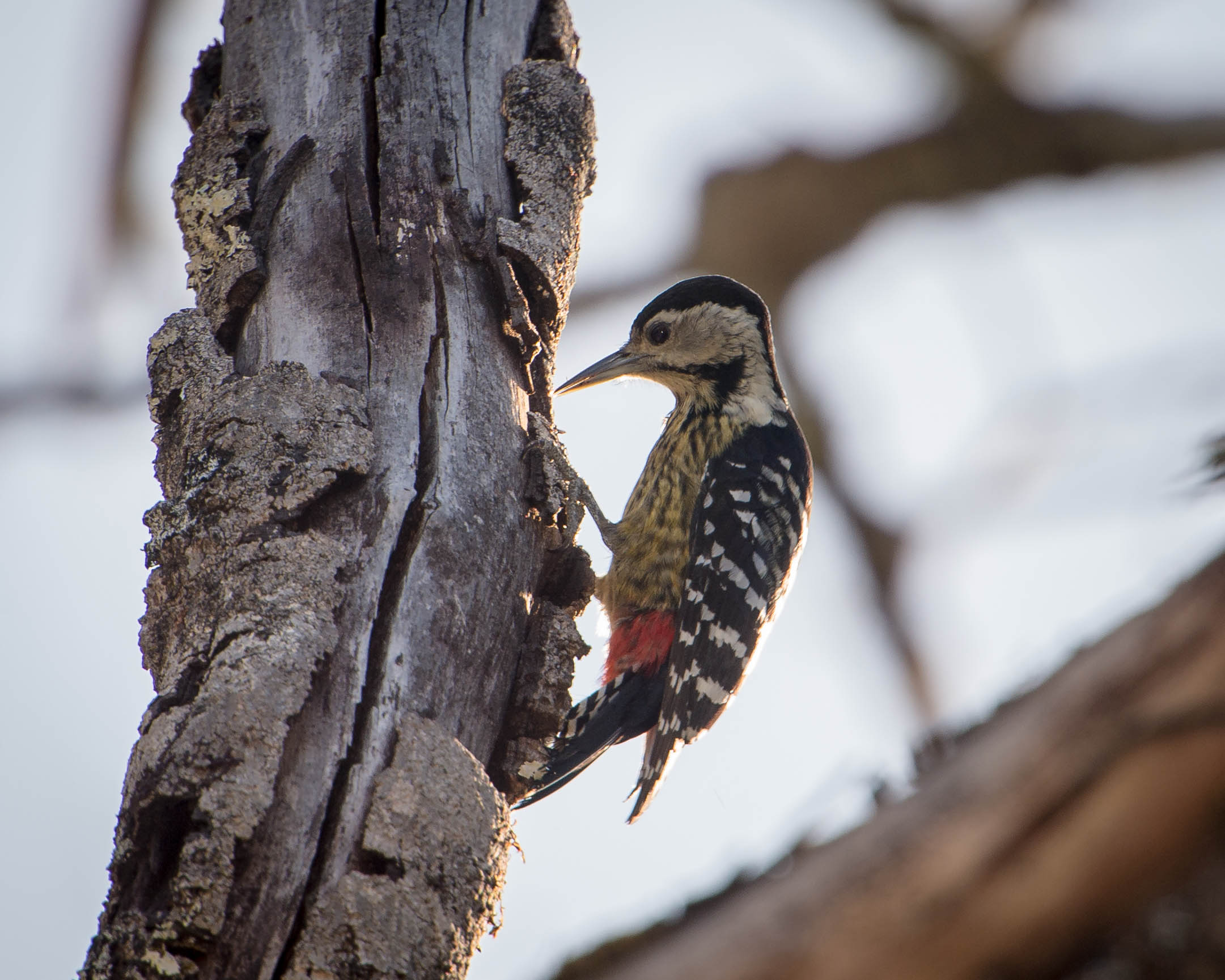

Conservation status
- Least Concern (IUCN 3.1)

Scientific classification
- Kingdom: Animalia
- Phylum: Chordata
- Class: Aves
- Order: Piciformes
- Family: Picidae
- Genus: Dendrocopos
- Species: D. atratus

Binomial name
- Dendrocopos atratus (Blyth, 1849)

Synonyms
- Dryobates atratus

= Stripe-breasted woodpecker =

Species of bird

The stripe-breasted woodpecker (Dendrocopos atratus) is a species of bird in the woodpecker family, Picidae. It is found in Southeast Asia within subtropical or tropical moist lowland forest and subtropical or tropical moist montane forest.

== Taxonomy and systematics ==
The species was first described in 1849 by the English zoologist Edward Blyth, who was curator of the museum of the Royal Asiatic Society of Bengal. He named it Dryobates atratus, but it was later transferred to the genus Dendrocopos. It forms a species-pair with the fulvous-breasted woodpecker (Dendrocopos macei). Birds in Vietnam are sometimes considered to be a separate race, vietnamensis, but the evidence for this is unconvincing.

== Description ==
Adult length is between 21 and 22 cm (8.3 and 8.7 in). The upper parts are black heavily barred with white, with the mantle being unbarred. The upper tail is black with some white markings on the outer feathers. The crown and nape are red in the male and black in the female. The face is whitish with a black moustache which unites with a stripe on the edge of the breast. The throat, breast and belly are greyish-yellow or greyish-buff, boldly streaked with black. The under tail coverts are red. The iris is chestnut and the beak is grey, long and sharply pointed. The legs and feet are bluish-grey. The juvenile has greyer underparts, the under-tail coverts are pink or orange, and the crown is a duller red in young males.

== Distribution and habitat ==
The stripe-breasted woodpecker is native to southeastern Asia. Its range extends from northeastern India to Vietnam and the province of Yunnan in southwestern China. It is a fairly uncommon species, but the population appears to be stable, and the International Union for Conservation of Nature has assessed its conservation status as being of "least concern".

The stripe-breasted woodpecker is mainly found in montane evergreen forest, particularly pine and oak forest, but also the edges of deciduous forests, as well as more open areas with scattered trees. Its altitudinal range is from about 800 to 2,800 m (2,600 to 9,200 ft) but it mostly occurs above 2,000 m (6,600 ft).

== Behaviour and ecology ==
The stripe-breasted woodpecker feeds in the mid to upper parts of the canopy on insects, particularly ants and beetle larvae, often foraging in pairs or small family groups. Breeding takes place from February onwards in many parts of the range, but from March to May in India and from April to May in Myanmar. The nest is excavated in a rotten stump or tree well above the ground. The clutch size is typically four or five, and on one occasion, two birds, an adult male and an adult female, were observed incubating the eggs at the same time.
