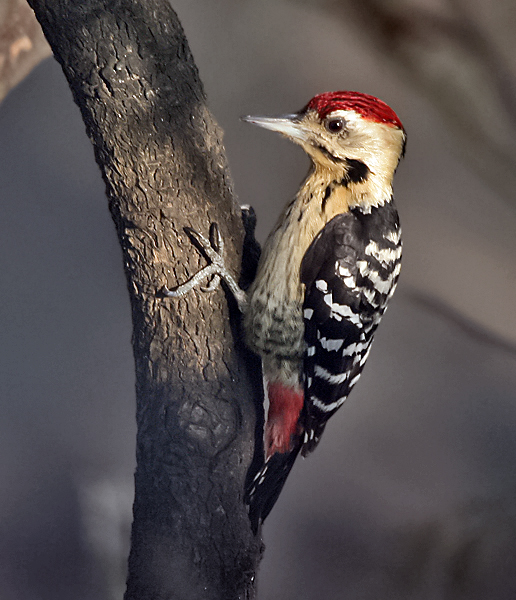
- In Kolkata, West Bengal, India.

Conservation status
- Least Concern (IUCN 3.1)

Scientific classification
- Kingdom: Animalia
- Phylum: Chordata
- Class: Aves
- Order: Piciformes
- Family: Picidae
- Genus: Dendrocopos
- Species: D. macei

Binomial name
- Dendrocopos macei (Vieillot, 1818)

= Fulvous-breasted woodpecker =

Species of bird in Picidae family

The fulvous-breasted woodpecker (Dendrocopos macei) is a species of bird in the family Picidae. It is found in Bangladesh, Bhutan, Nepal, India and Myanmar. The freckle-breasted woodpecker was formerly considered conspecific with this species.

== Description ==
A medium-sized, pied woodpecker. Upperparts black, heavily barred white. Undertail red, breast and belly buff with light flank barring and slight side streaking. Withish cheeks partly bordered by black line. Crown red in male with orange forehead, black in female.

== Habitat ==
Its natural habitats are subtropical or tropical dry forest, subtropical or tropical moist lowland forest, and subtropical or tropical moist montane forest.

== Gallery ==
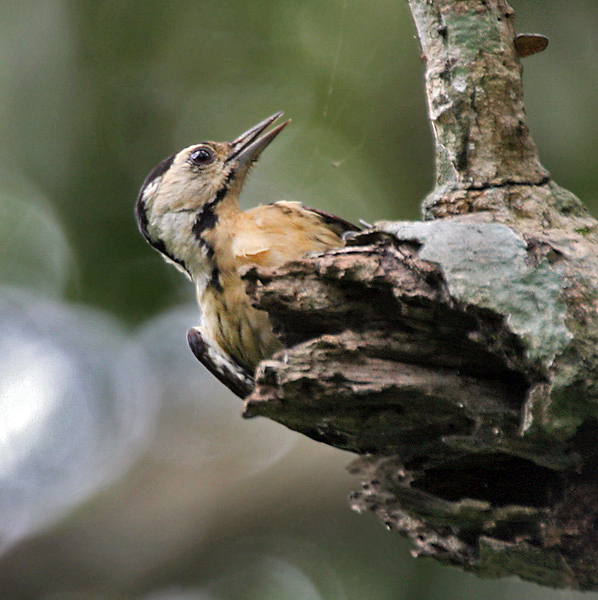

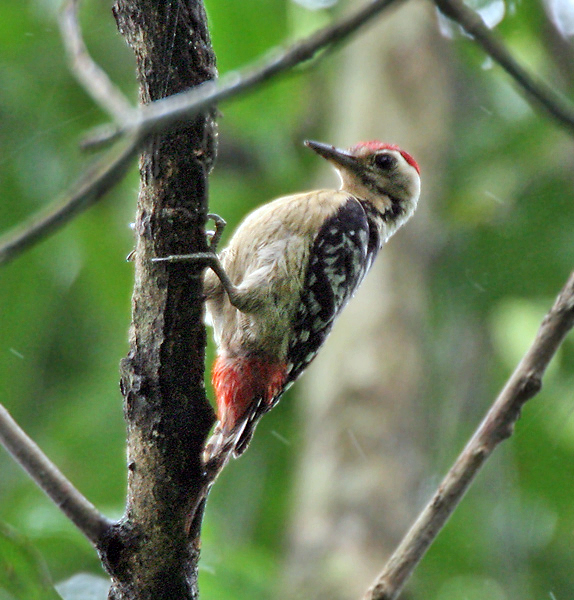
At Narendrapur near Kolkata, West Bengal, India.

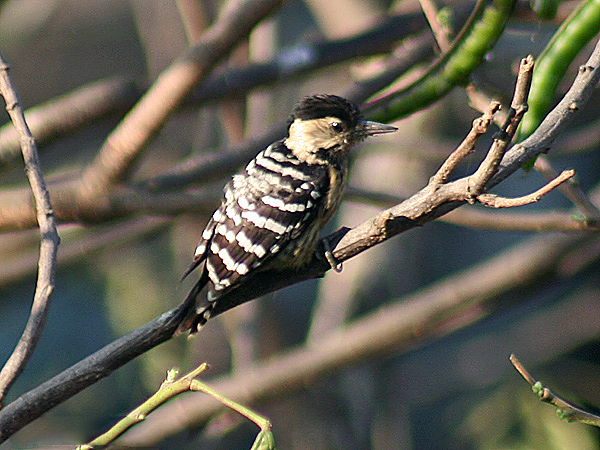
Female in Kolkata, West Bengal, India.

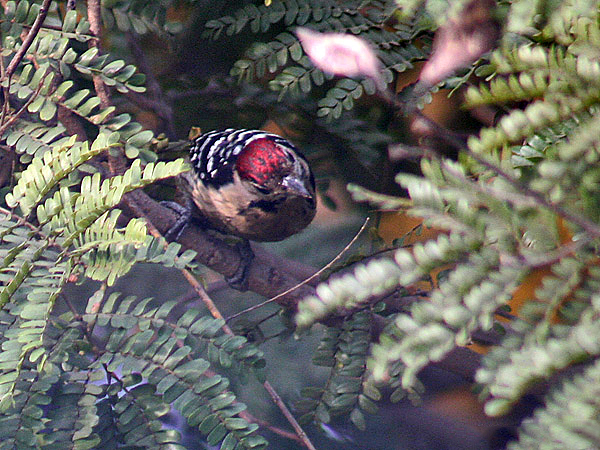
In Kolkata

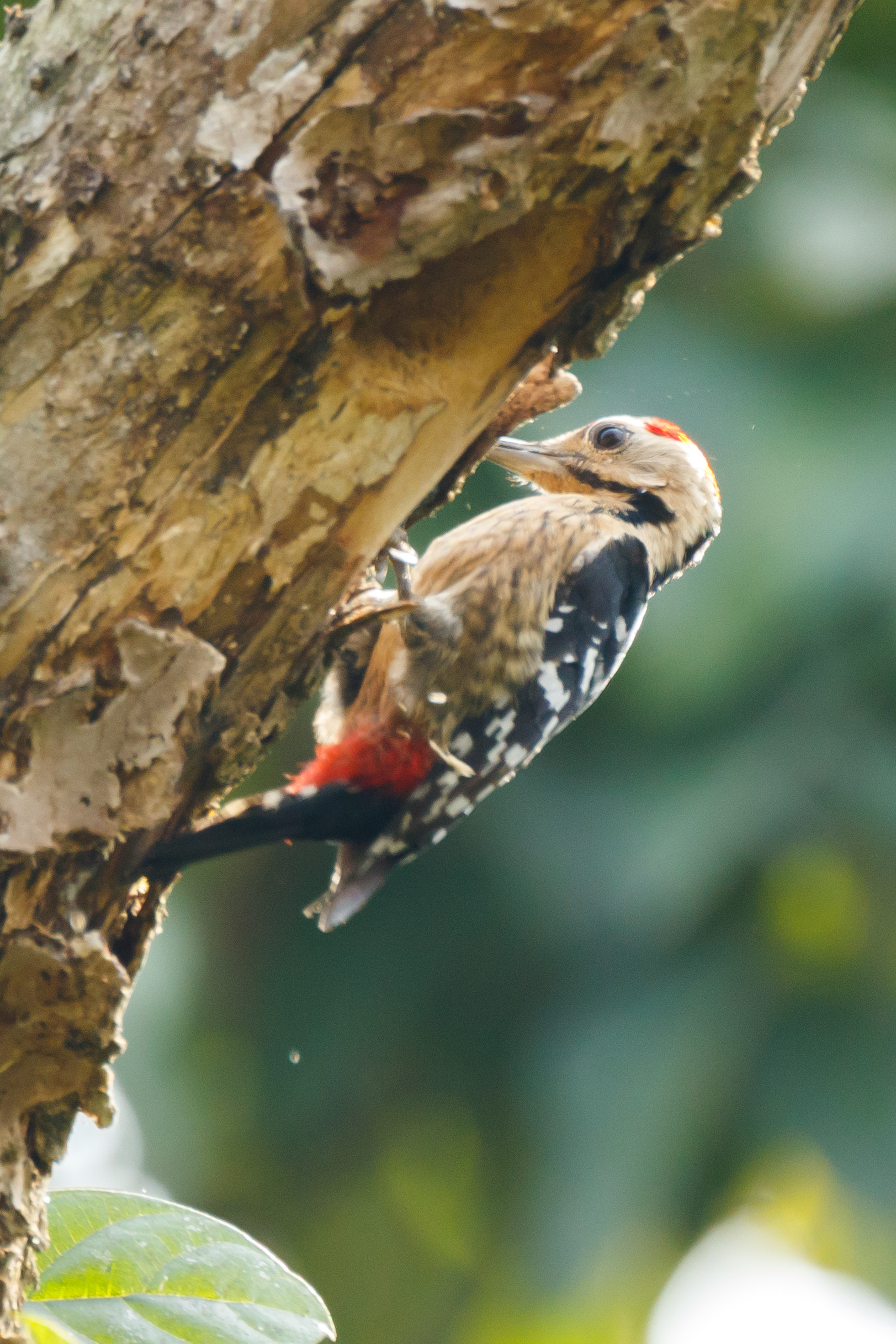
In Chitawan National Park, Nepal.
