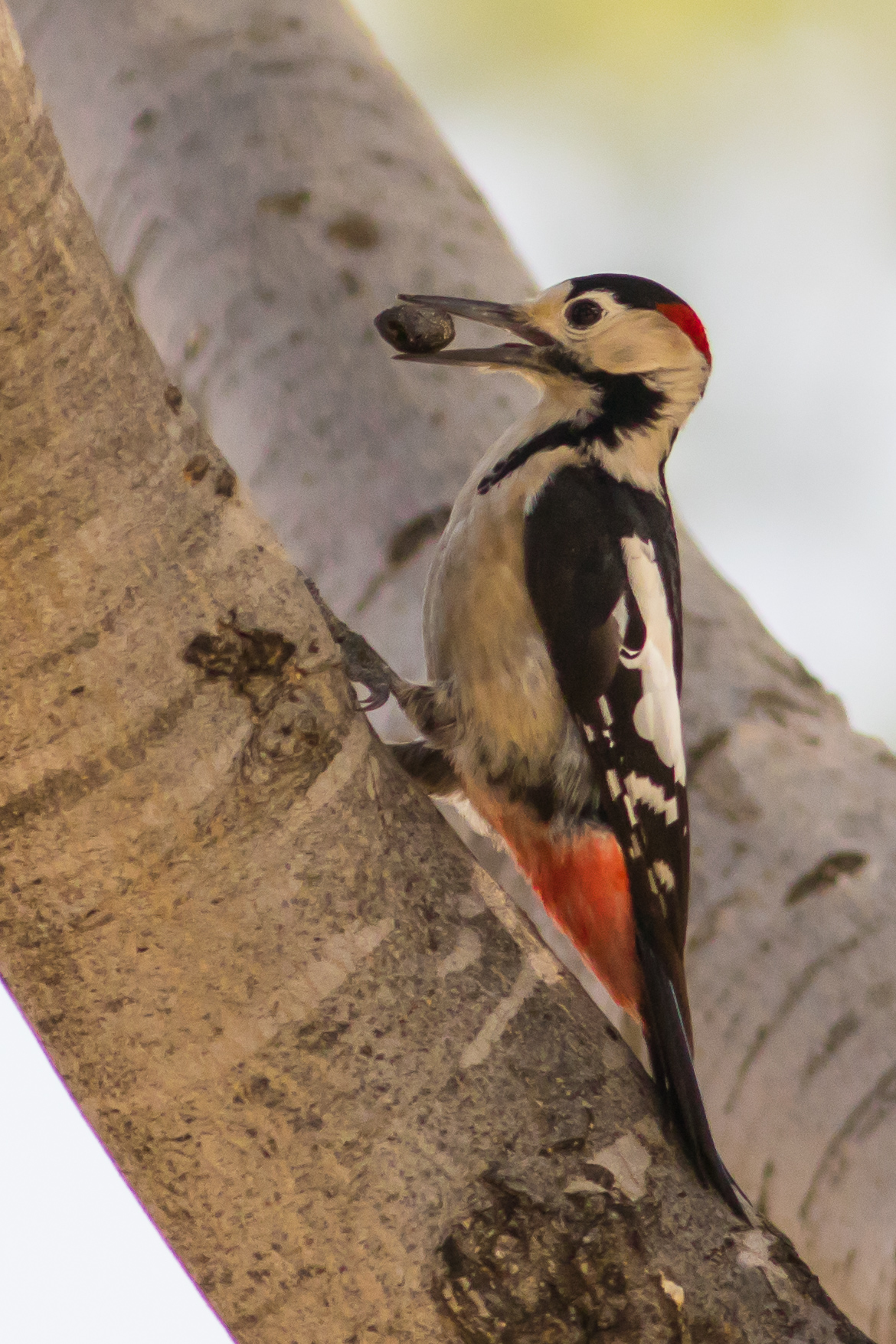

Conservation status
- Least Concern (IUCN 3.1)

Scientific classification
- Kingdom: Animalia
- Phylum: Chordata
- Class: Aves
- Order: Piciformes
- Family: Picidae
- Genus: Dendrocopos
- Species: D. syriacus

Binomial name
- Dendrocopos syriacus (Hemprich & Ehrenberg, 1833)
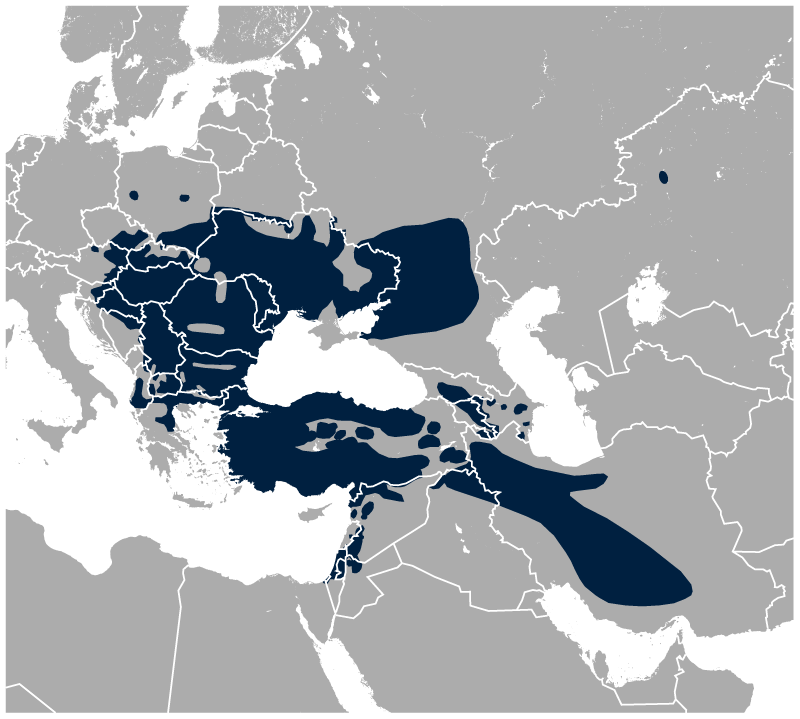
- Syrian Woodpecker range

= Syrian woodpecker =

Species of bird

The Syrian woodpecker (Dendrocopos syriacus) is a member of the woodpecker family, the Picidae.

== Taxonomy ==
The Syrian woodpecker was first described as Picus syriacus by Wilhelm Hemprich and Christian Gottfried Ehrenberg in 1833, from a specimen collected on Mount Lebanon.

== Distribution and habitat ==
The woodpecker is a resident breeding bird from southeastern Europe east to Iran. Its range has expanded further northwest into Europe in recent years. It is an inhabitant of open woodlands, cultivation with trees and scrubs, and parks, depending for food and nesting sites upon old trees. It is often an inconspicuous bird, in spite of the plumage.

== Description ==
The woodpecker is 23 cm (9.1 in) long, and is very similar to the great spotted woodpecker, Dendrocopos major. The upper parts of the male are glossy black, with a crimson spot on the nape and white on the forehead, sides of the face and neck. On the shoulder is a large white patch and the flight feathers are black with white spots forming three wingbars. The three outer tail feathers show only a few white spots; these show when the short stiff tail is outspread, acting as a support in climbing. The under parts are buffish white, the abdomen and under tail coverts reddish. The long bill is slate black and the legs greenish grey. The female has no crimson on the nape, and in the young this nape spot is absent, but the crown is crimson.

It differs from the smaller lesser spotted woodpecker by the crimson on the abdomen and the white shoulder-patches. It is much harder to distinguish Syrian woodpecker from the great spotted woodpecker. Syrian has a longer bill, has more white on the head, and lacks the white tail barring of the great spotted.

== Behaviour ==
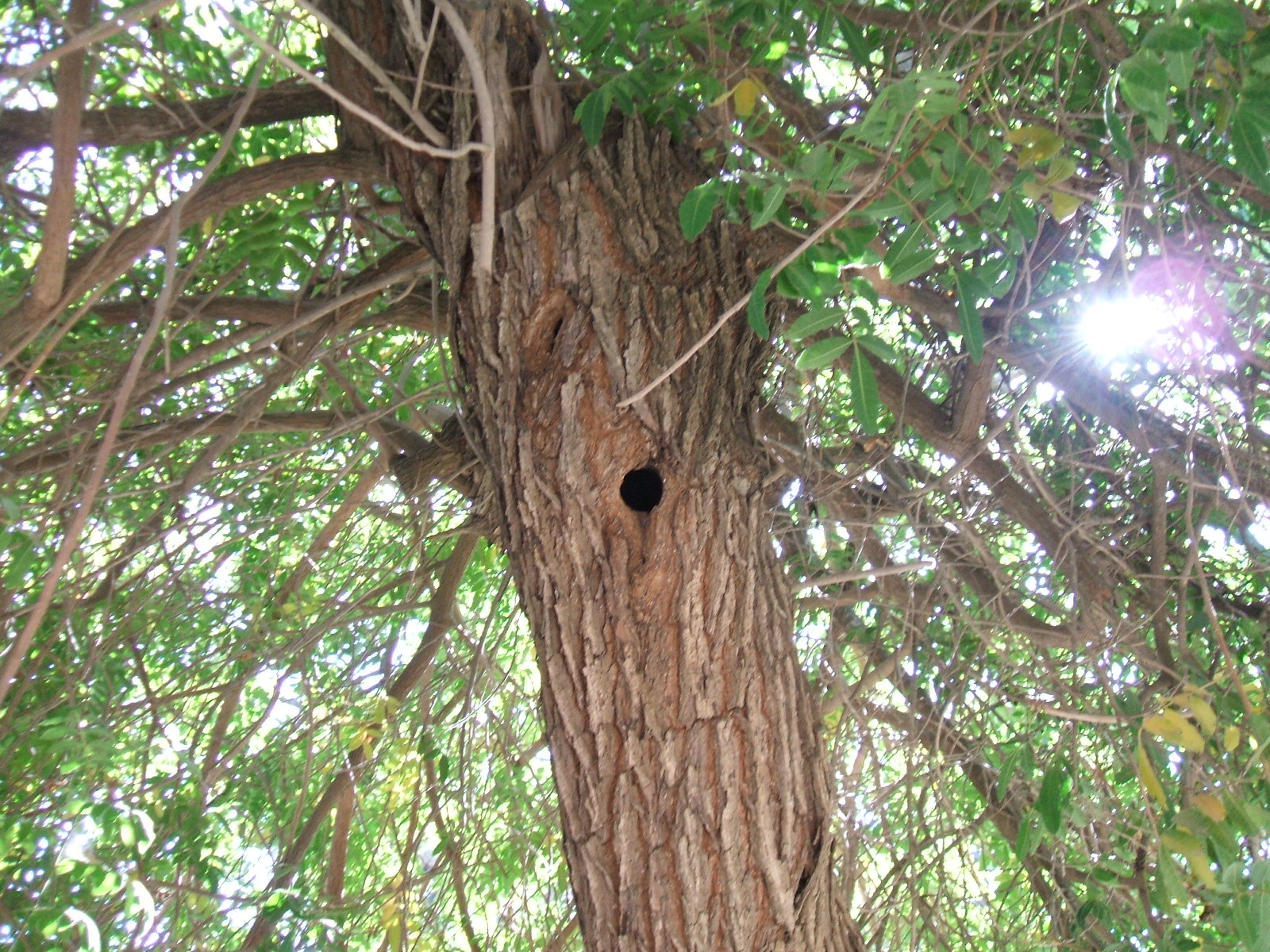
Tree with a Syrian woodpecker's hole.

=== Communication ===
When hidden by the foliage, the Syrian woodpecker's presence is often advertised by the mechanical drumming, a vibrating rattle, produced by the rapidly repeated blows of its strong bill upon a trunk or branch. This is not merely a mating call or challenge, but a signal of either sex. It is audible from a great distance, depending on the wind and the condition of the wood, and a hollow bough naturally produces a louder note than living wood. The drumming is longer than great spotted woodpecker's, and decreases in volume. It is faster and shorter than the drumming of white-backed woodpecker. The call is a sharp quit, quit, softer than great spotted woodpecker, and something like common redshank.

=== Feeding ===
The Syrian woodpecker's food mainly consists of those insects which bore into the timber of forest trees, such as the larvae of wood boring moths and beetles. Additional prey includes bees such as Xylocopa pubescens. The woodpecker usually alights on the trunk, working upwards. During the ascent it taps the bark, breaking off fragments, but often extracts its prey from crevices with the tip of its sticky tongue. Seeds, nuts and berries are eaten when insect food is scarce. Its actions are jerky, and it hops rather than climbs, leaping forward with one foot just in advance of the other. Usually feeding in a vertically 'heads-up" position, it is not uncommon for the woodpecker to assume a vertically or horizontally upside-down attitude while probing a tree for food. When a space is crossed the flight is easy and undulating. The Syrian woodpecker attacks polyethylene pipes of both sprinkler and drip irrigation systems in Israel. It pecks holes that are 2-10 mm (mostly 5-8 mm) in diameter, and are usually well rounded. Damage to pipes is frequent in plots of avocado, citrus and grapevines bordered by rows of windbreakers, with pipes near windbreaker being the most severely attacked. The holes in the irrigation pipes lead to a fall in the water pressure which in turn reduces the amount of water emitted at various sections along the irrigation line. The reason for birds' pecking at the pipe is not clear.

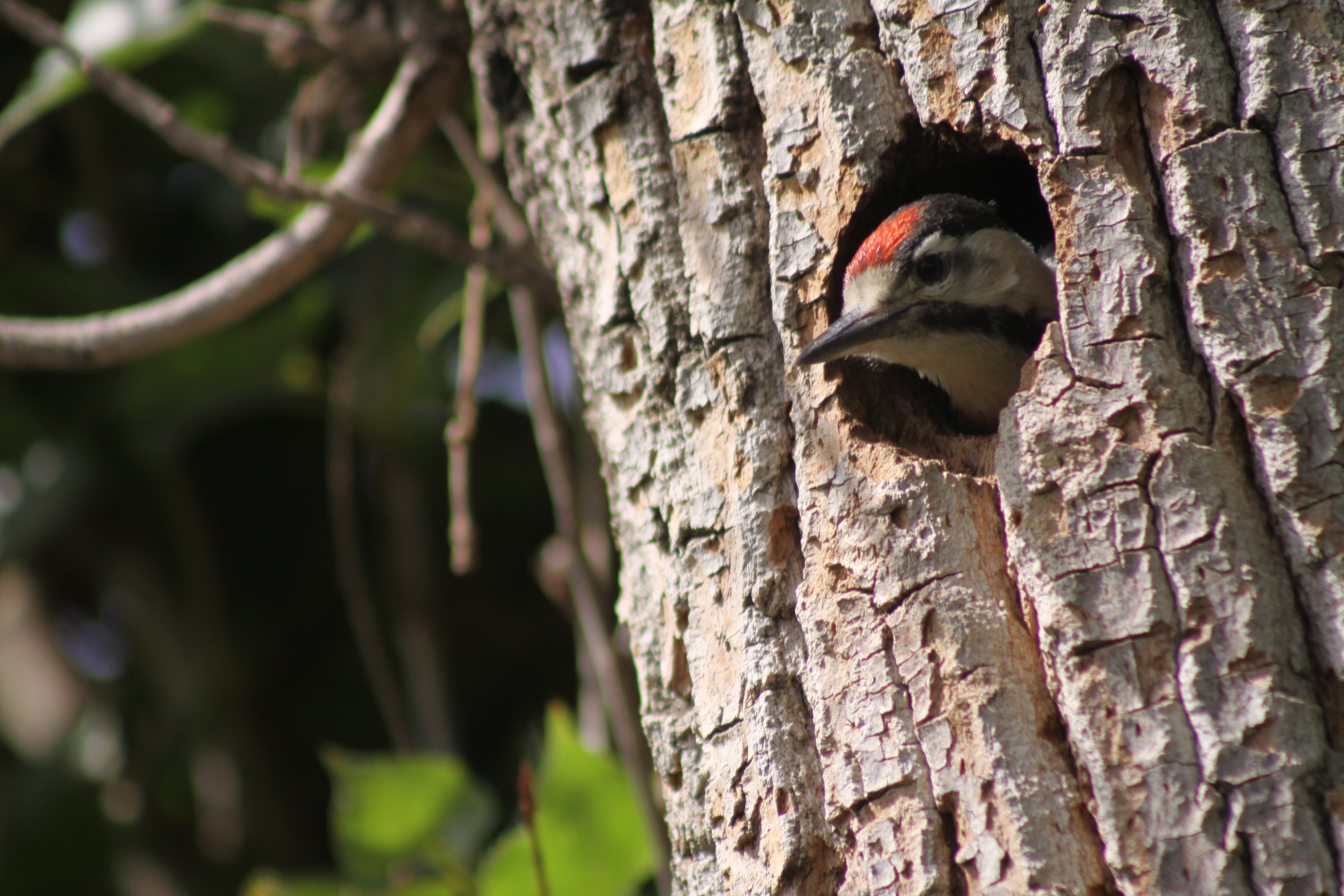
Matured chick of a Syrian woodpecker, peeking out of its nesting hole

=== Breeding ===
The neat, round 5 cm diameter nesting hole, is bored in soft or decaying wood horizontally for a few inches, then perpendicularly down. At the bottom of the shaft, a small chamber is excavated, where up to 11 creamy white eggs are laid on wood chips. The hole is rarely used again, but not infrequently other holes are bored in the same tree. Almost any tree sufficiently rotten is used. The young, when the parents are feeding them, cluster at the mouth of the hole and keep a continuous chatter, but when alarmed slip back into the hole.
