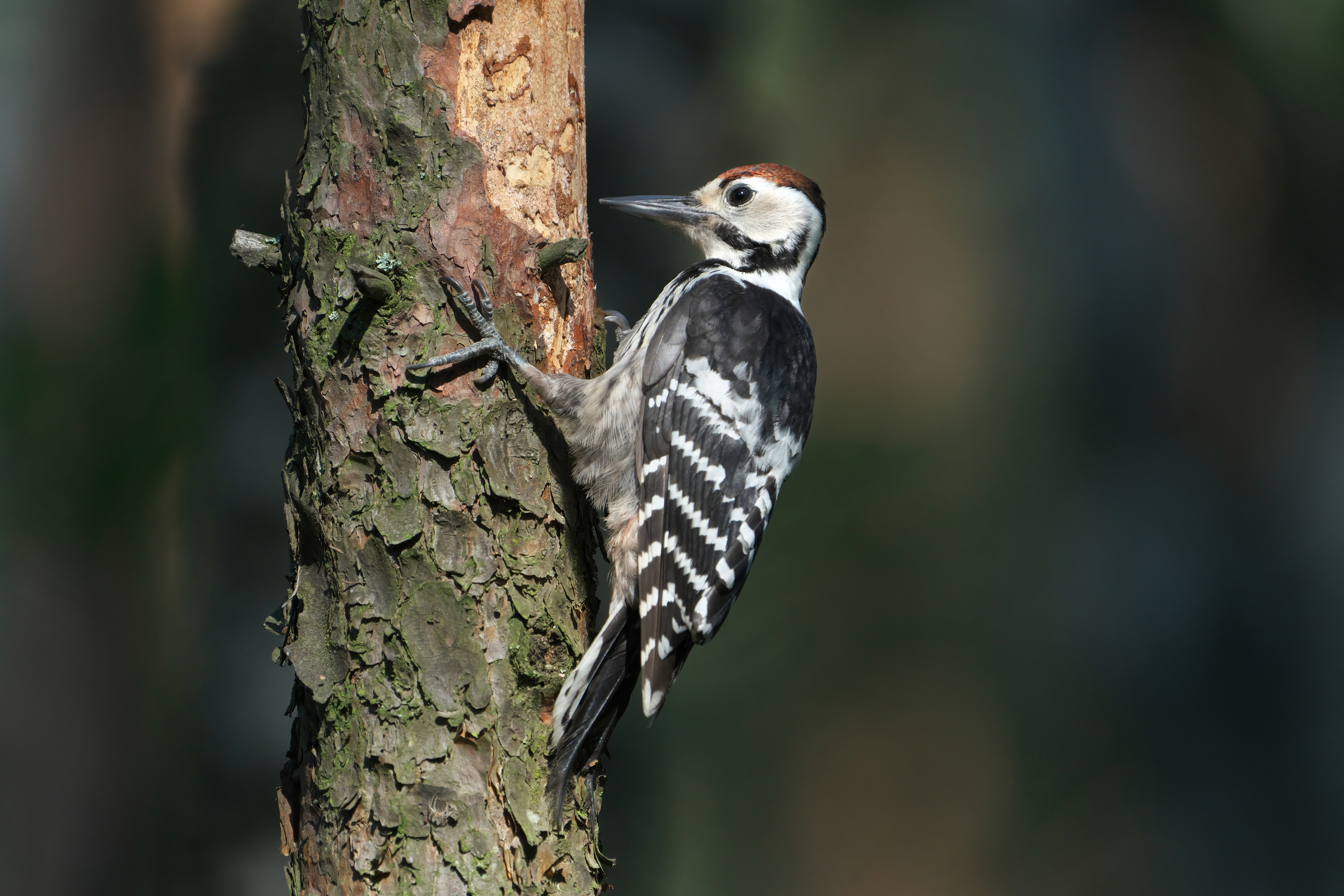
- White-backed woodpecker (Dendrocopos leucotos)

Scientific classification
- Kingdom: Animalia
- Phylum: Chordata
- Class: Aves
- Order: Piciformes
- Family: Picidae
- Tribe: Melanerpini
- Genus: Dendrocopos; Koch, 1816

Type species
- Picus major Linnaeus, 1758 Linnaeus, 1758

Species
- See text

= Dendrocopos =

Dendrocopos Temporal range: 2.588–0 Ma

Genus of birds

Dendrocopos is a widespread genus of woodpeckers from Asia, Europe and Northern Africa. The species range from the Philippines to the British Isles.

== Taxonomy ==
The genus Dendrocopos was introduced in 1816 by the German naturalist Carl Ludwig Koch. The name combines the Ancient Greek dendron meaning "tree" with kopos meaning "striking". The type species was designated as Picus major Linnaeus, 1758, the great spotted woodpecker, by the Scottish ornithologist Edward Hargitt in 1890 in his catalogue of woodpeckers in the collection of the British Museum.

The genus at one time contained around 25 species. A molecular phylogenetic analysis of the pied woodpeckers published in 2015 found that Dendrocopos was polyphyletic. In the rearranged genera the number of species in Dendrocopos was reduced to 12 as listed below.

== Species ==
Image	Scientific name	Common name	Distribution
	Dendrocopos hyperythrus	Rufous-bellied woodpecker	Indian subcontinent and Southeast and East Asia, ranging across Bangladesh, Bhutan, Cambodia, Hong Kong, India, North Korea, South Korea, Myanmar, Nepal, Thailand, and Vietnam
	Dendrocopos macei	Fulvous-breasted woodpecker	Bangladesh, Bhutan, Nepal, India and Myanmar
	Dendrocopos analis	Freckle-breasted woodpecker	Indonesia, Laos, Myanmar, Thailand, and Vietnam
	Dendrocopos atratus	Stripe-breasted woodpecker	India to Vietnam and the province of Yunnan in southwestern China
	Dendrocopos darjellensis	Darjeeling woodpecker	Bhutan, India, Myanmar, Nepal and Tibet
	Dendrocopos himalayensis	Himalayan woodpecker	Afghanistan, India, Nepal, Bhutan and Pakistan
	Dendrocopos assimilis	Sind woodpecker	India (extreme west), Iran, and Pakistan
	Dendrocopos syriacus	Syrian woodpecker	southeastern Europe east to Iran
	Dendrocopos leucopterus	White-winged woodpecker	Afghanistan, China, Iran, Kazakhstan, Kyrgyzstan, Tajikistan, Turkmenistan, Uzbekistan
	Dendrocopos major	Great spotted woodpecker	British Isles to Japan, and in North Africa from Morocco to Tunisia
	Dendrocopos noguchii	Okinawa woodpecker	Okinawa in Japan
	Dendrocopos leucotos	White-backed woodpecker	Eastern Europe across the Palearctic to Japan
