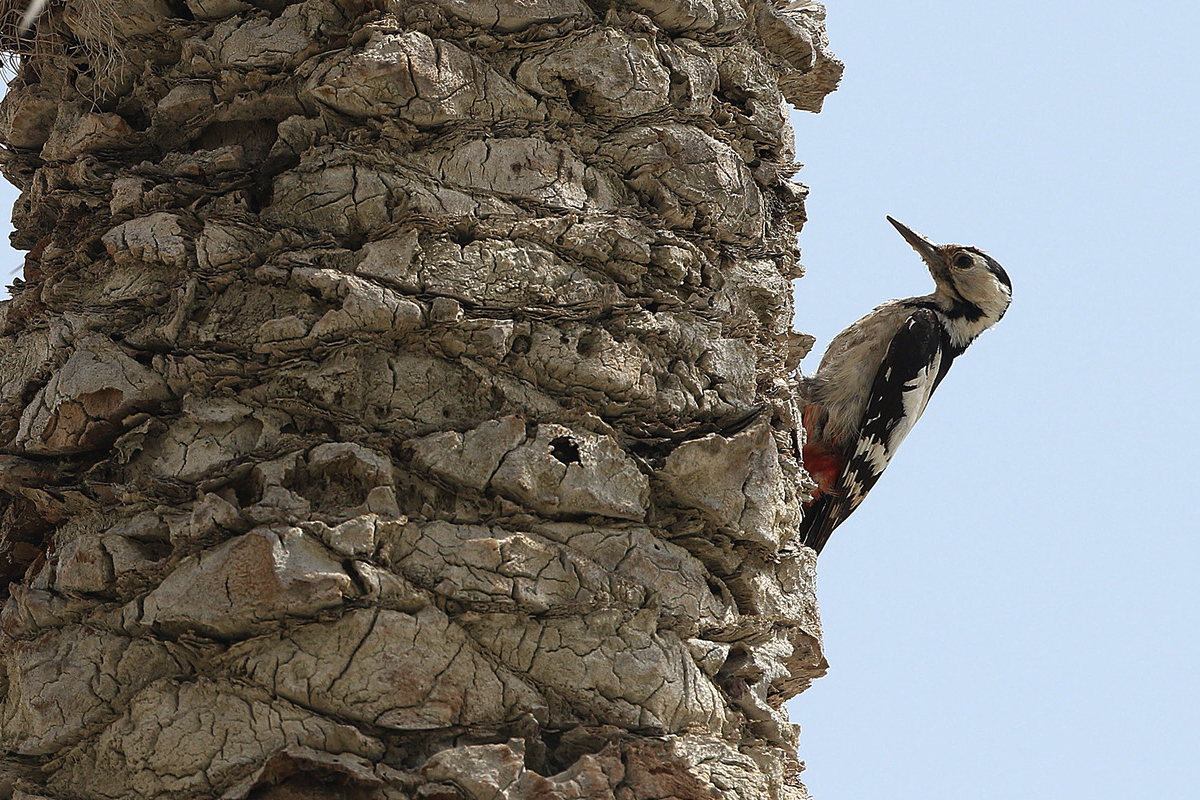
- Sind woodpecker at Bandar Abbas, Iran

Conservation status
- Least Concern (IUCN 3.1)

Scientific classification
- Kingdom: Animalia
- Phylum: Chordata
- Class: Aves
- Order: Piciformes
- Family: Picidae
- Genus: Dendrocopos
- Species: D. assimilis

Binomial name
- Dendrocopos assimilis (Blyth, 1849)
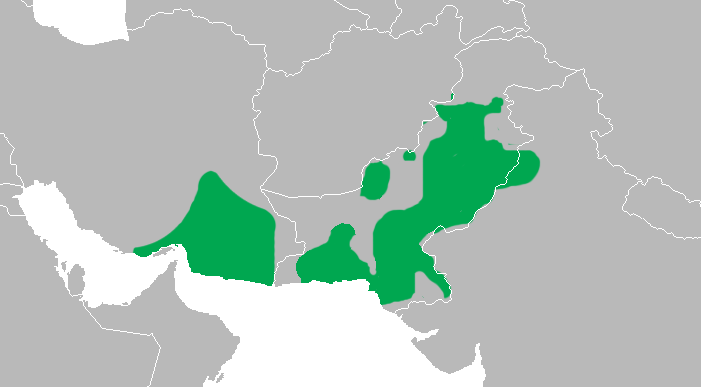

= Sind woodpecker =

Species of bird

The Sind woodpecker (Dendrocopos assimilis) is a species of bird in the woodpecker family Picidae. It is native to Sindh province of Pakistan, the far west of India, and southern Iran.

== Description ==
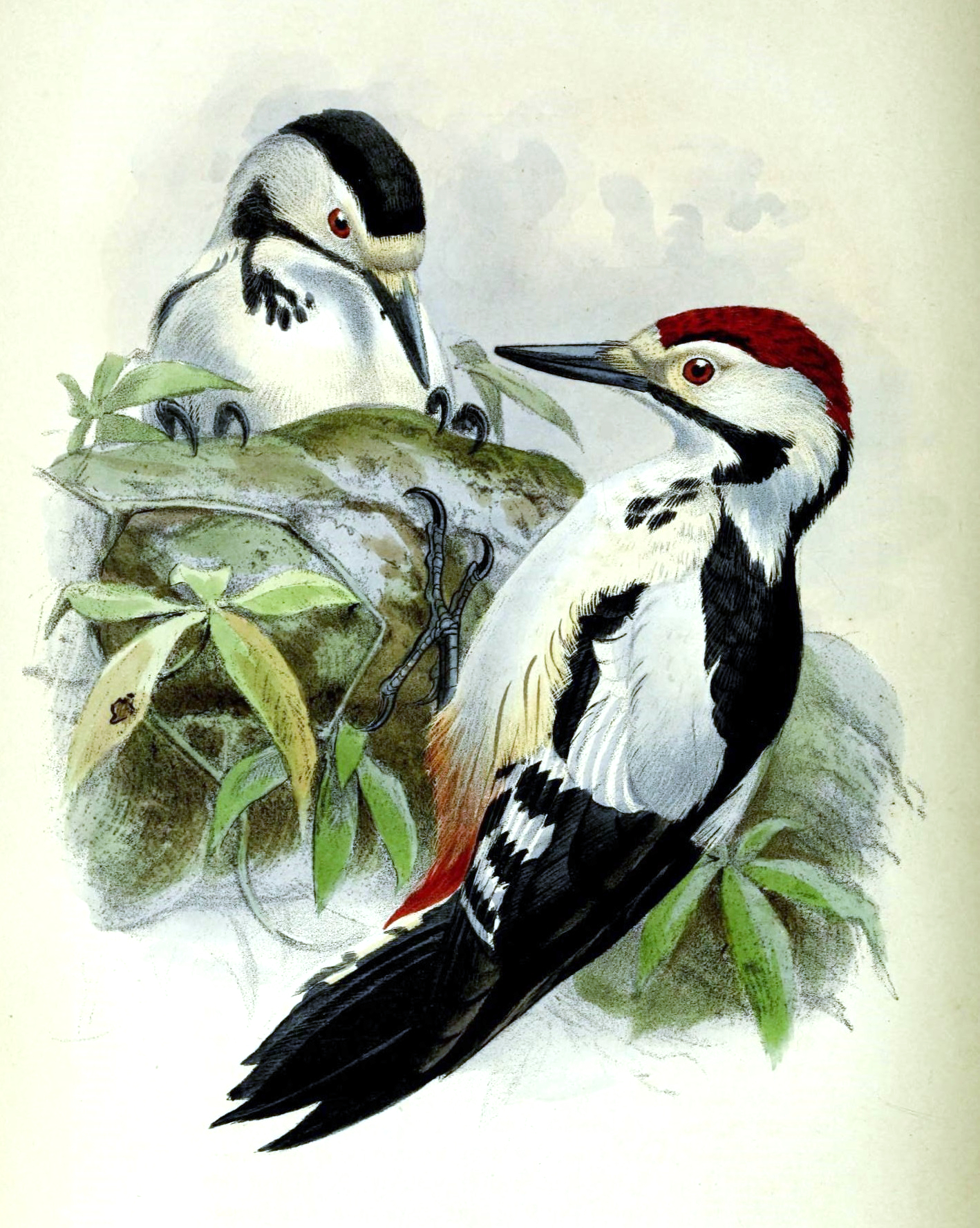
Illustration from the species' first publication

Sind woodpeckers are similar to Syrian woodpecker in appearance, but is slightly smaller (20–22 cm, versus 23 cm), with a thin moustachial stripe, and extensive white feathers on their back and smaller beak. Sind woodpeckers have large white shoulder patches and white bars on its black feathers. The males have a red crown with a fine black line at the sides, females an all-black crown; both have a white forehead. As with most other Dendrocopos woodpeckers, it has red under-tail coverts. In most of its range it is the only black and white woodpecker, except for parts of east-central Pakistan and westernmost India, where it overlaps with yellow-crowned woodpecker (Leiopicus mahrattensis).

== Distribution and diet ==
The woodpecker is a resident bird and native to Sindh in Pakistan, India and southern Iran. They have moderate forest reliance and can be found up to the altitude of 2,200 metres, but are also found in rural gardens and plantations. Naturally they are found in tropical and subtropical dry forests, riverine forests, thorny shrub-lands, dry scrub-lands and wetlands like freshwater springs and oases.

They are non-migratory birds, with mostly population dispersing after breeding locally.

The diet mostly consist of insects, including woodboring beetles, larvae, spiders and ants.

== Reproduction ==
The breeding season occurs between March and April. These species are monogamous, with both the parents raising the young ones; they nest in tree holes excavated by the breeding pair. They lay about 3 to 5 eggs, with both the parents incubating them. The chicks hatch after 12 days of incubation and fledgling occurs after 20 days. The juvenile disperse to new location.

== Status ==
The global population of the Sind woodpecker has not been evaluated. The general population of the species is stable. In the greater part of its range, the Sind woodpecker is locally common, but it is rare in its limited Indian range. The average age length is 5.2 years. Its distribution size is around 1,490,000 square km. Deforestation is a main threat to the species.
