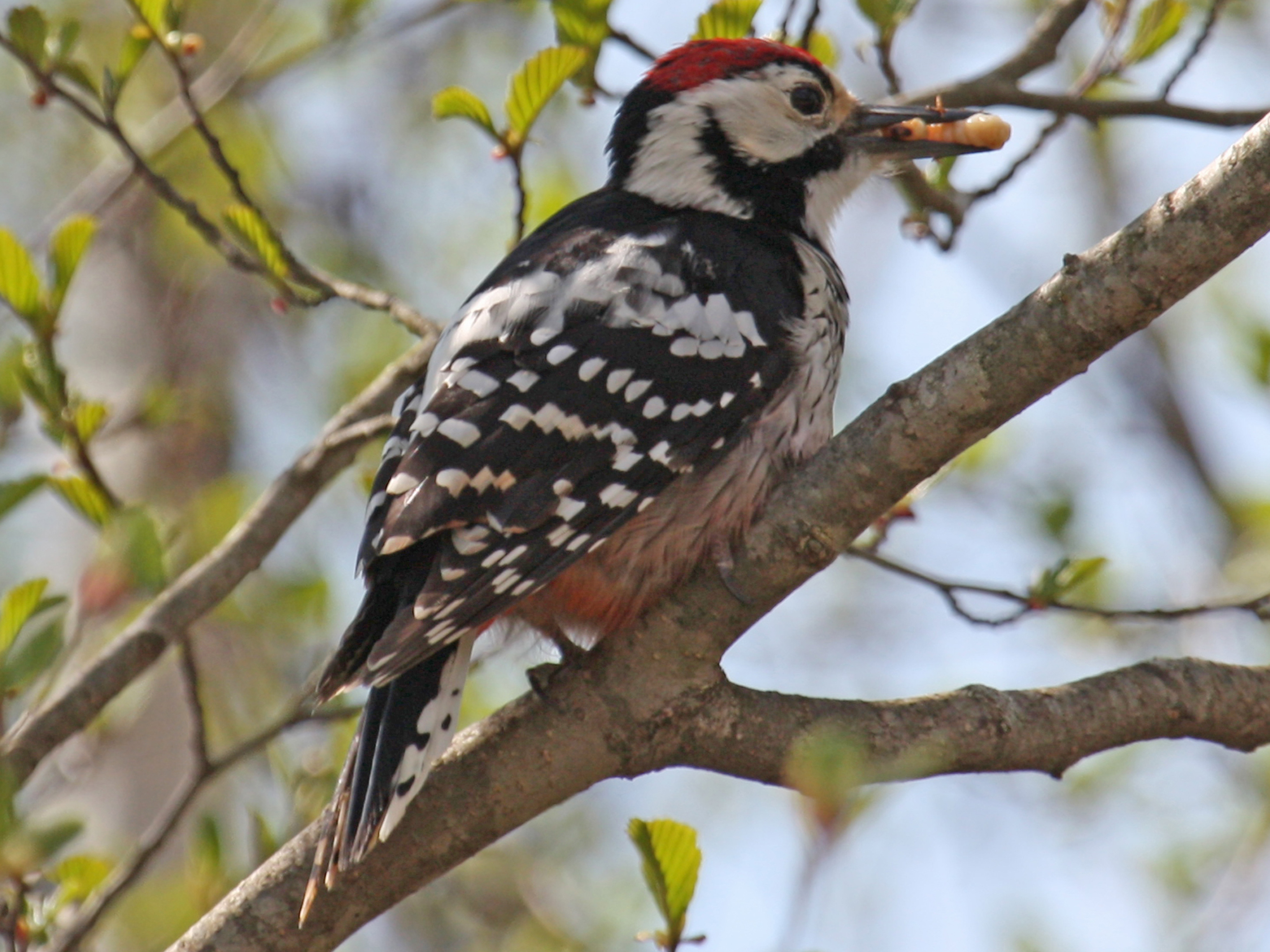
- Male
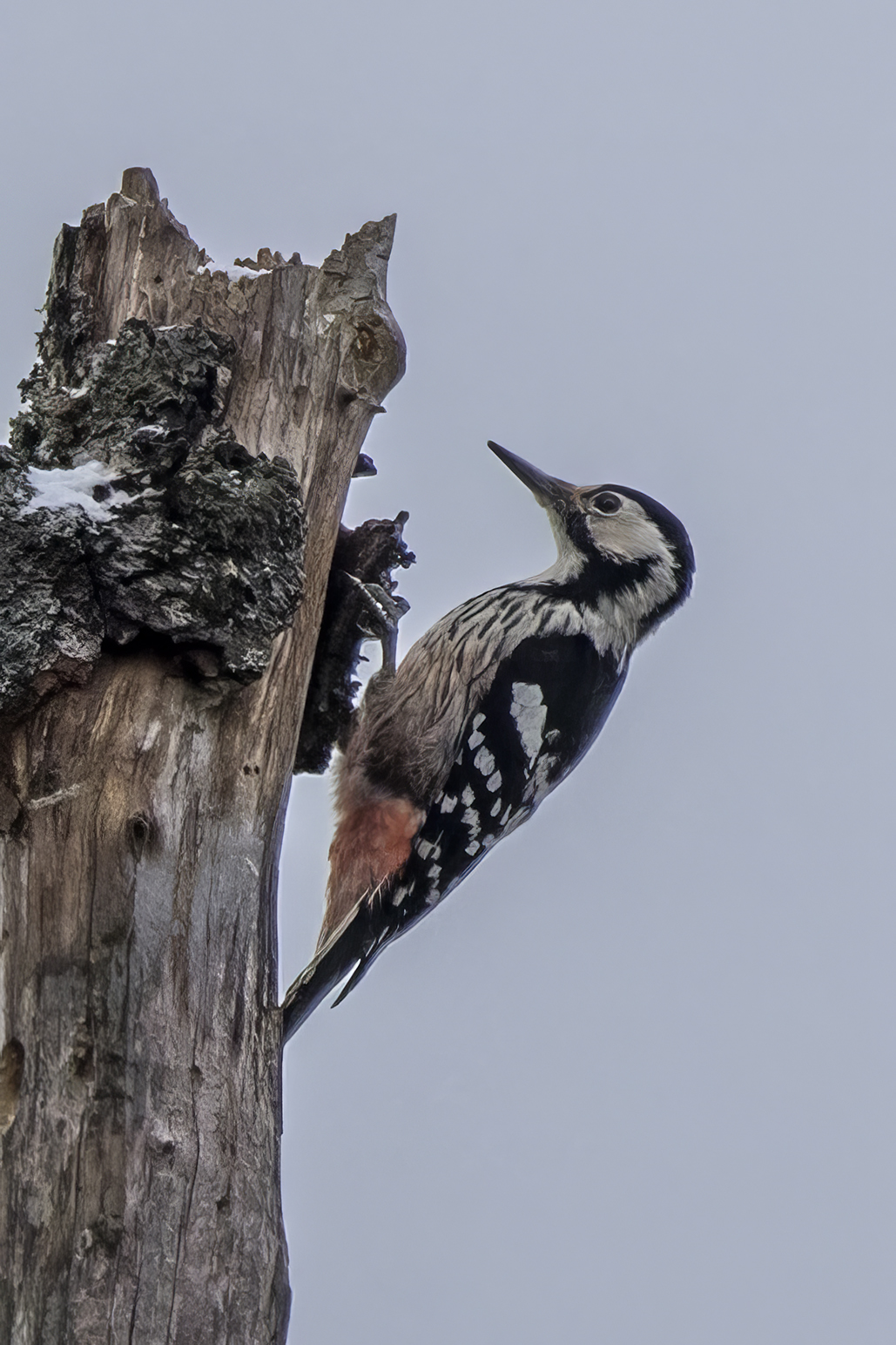
- Female

Conservation status
- Least Concern (IUCN 3.1)

Scientific classification
- Kingdom: Animalia
- Phylum: Chordata
- Class: Aves
- Order: Piciformes
- Family: Picidae
- Genus: Dendrocopos
- Species: D. leucotos

Binomial name
- Dendrocopos leucotos (Bechstein, 1802)
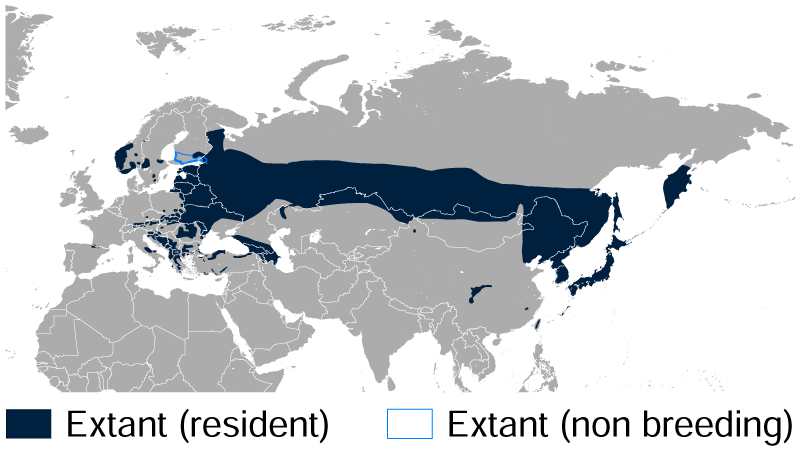
- White-backed Woodpecker range
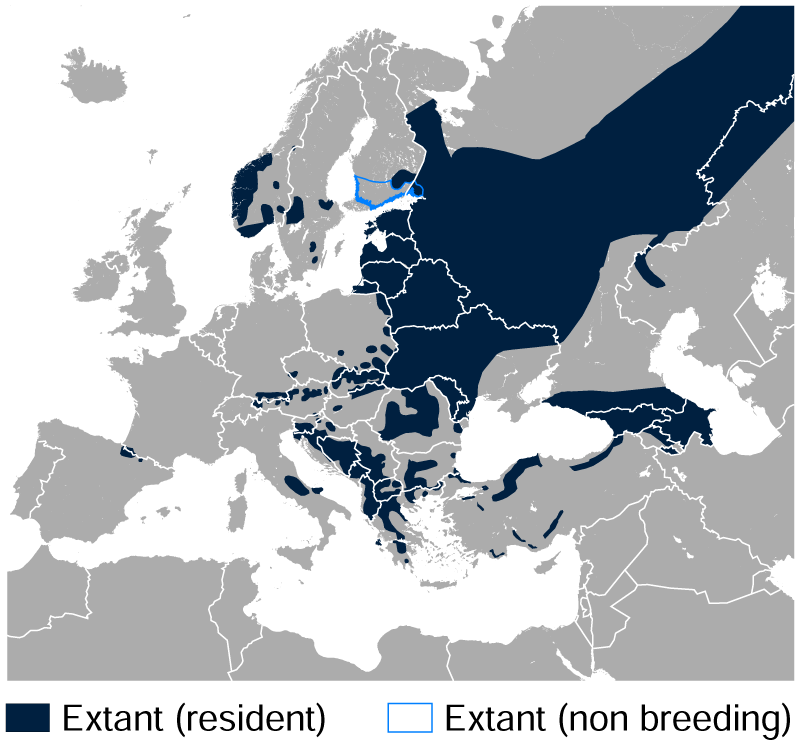
- White-backed Woodpecker range in Europe and western Asia

Synonyms
- Picus leucotos Bechstein, 1802

= White-backed woodpecker =

Species of bird

The white-backed woodpecker (Dendrocopos leucotos) is a Eurasian woodpecker belonging to the genus Dendrocopos.

== Taxonomy ==
The white-backed woodpecker was described by the German naturalist Johann Matthäus Bechstein in 1802 under the binomial name Picus leucotos. The specific epithet leucotos combines the Classical Greek leukos meaning "white" and -nōtos meaning "-backed". The type locality is Silesia, a historical region mainly located in Poland. The species is now placed in the genus Dendrocopos that was introduced by the German naturalist Carl Ludwig Koch in 1816.

Twelve subspecies are recognised.

- D. l. leucotos (Bechstein, 1802) – widespread across Eurasia from north, central and eastern Europe to northeast Asia, Korea and Sakhalin
- D. l. uralensis (Malherbe, 1860) – west Ural Mountains to Lake Baikal
- D. l. lilfordi (Sharpe & Dresser, 1871) – Pyrenees to Asia Minor, Caucasus and Transcaucasia
- D. l. tangi Cheng, 1956 – Sichuan province, western China
- D. l. subcirris (Stejneger, 1886) – Hokkaido, northern Japan
- D. l. stejnegeri (Kuroda, 1921) – northern Honshū, Japan
- D. l. namiyei (Stejneger, 1886) – south Honshū, Kyushu, Shikoku (Japan)
- D. l. takahashii (Kuroda & Mori, 1920) – Ulleungdo Island (off eastern Korea)
- D. l. quelpartensis (Kuroda & Mori, 1918) – Jeju Island (off South Korea)
- D. l. owstoni (Ogawa, 1905) – Amami Ōshima Island in the northern Ryukyu Islands, Japan
- D. l. fohkiensis (Buturlin, 1908) – mountains of Fujian province, southeast China
- D. l. insularis (Gould, 1863) – Taiwan

The subspecies D. l. owstoni is sometimes considered a distinct species, the Amami woodpecker.

== Description ==
It is the largest of the spotted woodpeckers in the western Palearctic, 24–26 cm long with wing-span 38–40 cm. The plumage is similar to the great spotted woodpecker, but with white bars across the wings rather than spots, and a white lower back. The male has a red crown, the female a black one. Drumming by males is very loud, calls include a soft kiuk and a longer kweek.

== Distribution ==
The nominate race D. l. leucotos occurs in central and northern Europe, with the race D. l. lilfordi found in the Balkans and Turkey. Ten further races occur in the region eastwards as far as Korea and Japan. It is a scarce bird, requiring large tracts of mature deciduous forests with high amounts of standing and lying dead wood. Numbers have decreased in Nordic countries. In Sweden, its population decline has caused the Swedish government to enact protection for the species in the national Biodiversity Action Plan.

== Ecology ==
In the breeding season it excavates a nest hole about 7 cm wide and 30 cm deep in a decaying tree trunk. It lays three to five white eggs and incubates for 10–11 days. It lives predominantly on wood-boring beetles as well as their larvae, as well as other insects, nuts, seeds and berries.

=== Life Span ===
In the wild, white-backed woodpeckers can survive between three and four years, while in captivity they can survive for approximately eleven years.
