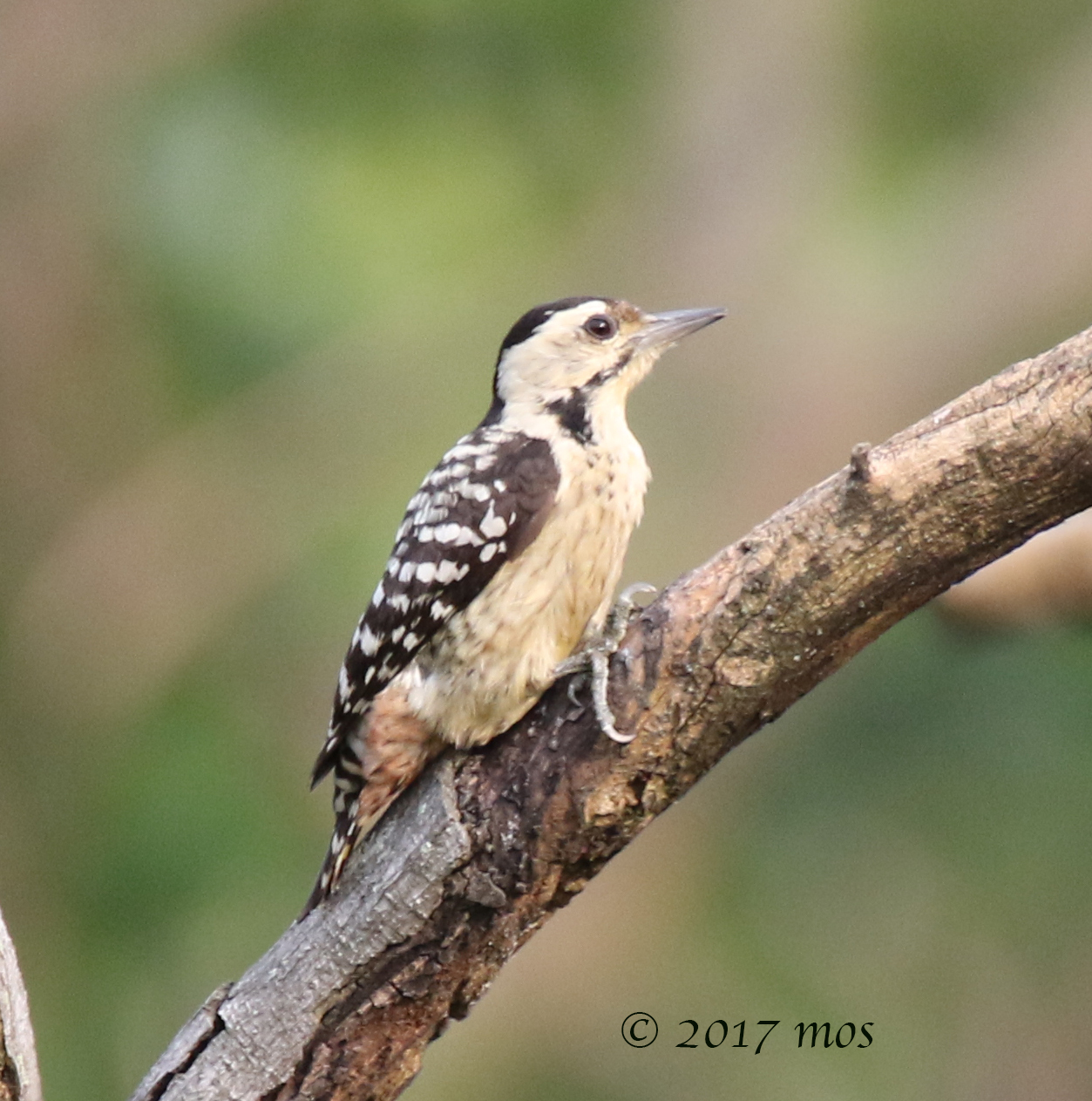

Conservation status
- Least Concern (IUCN 3.1)

Scientific classification
- Kingdom: Animalia
- Phylum: Chordata
- Class: Aves
- Order: Piciformes
- Family: Picidae
- Genus: Dendrocopos
- Species: D. analis

Binomial name
- Dendrocopos analis (Bonaparte, 1850)

= Freckle-breasted woodpecker =

Species of bird

The freckle-breasted woodpecker (Dendrocopos analis) is a species of bird in the family Picidae. It is found in Indonesia, Laos, Myanmar, Thailand, Cambodia, and Vietnam.

== Description ==
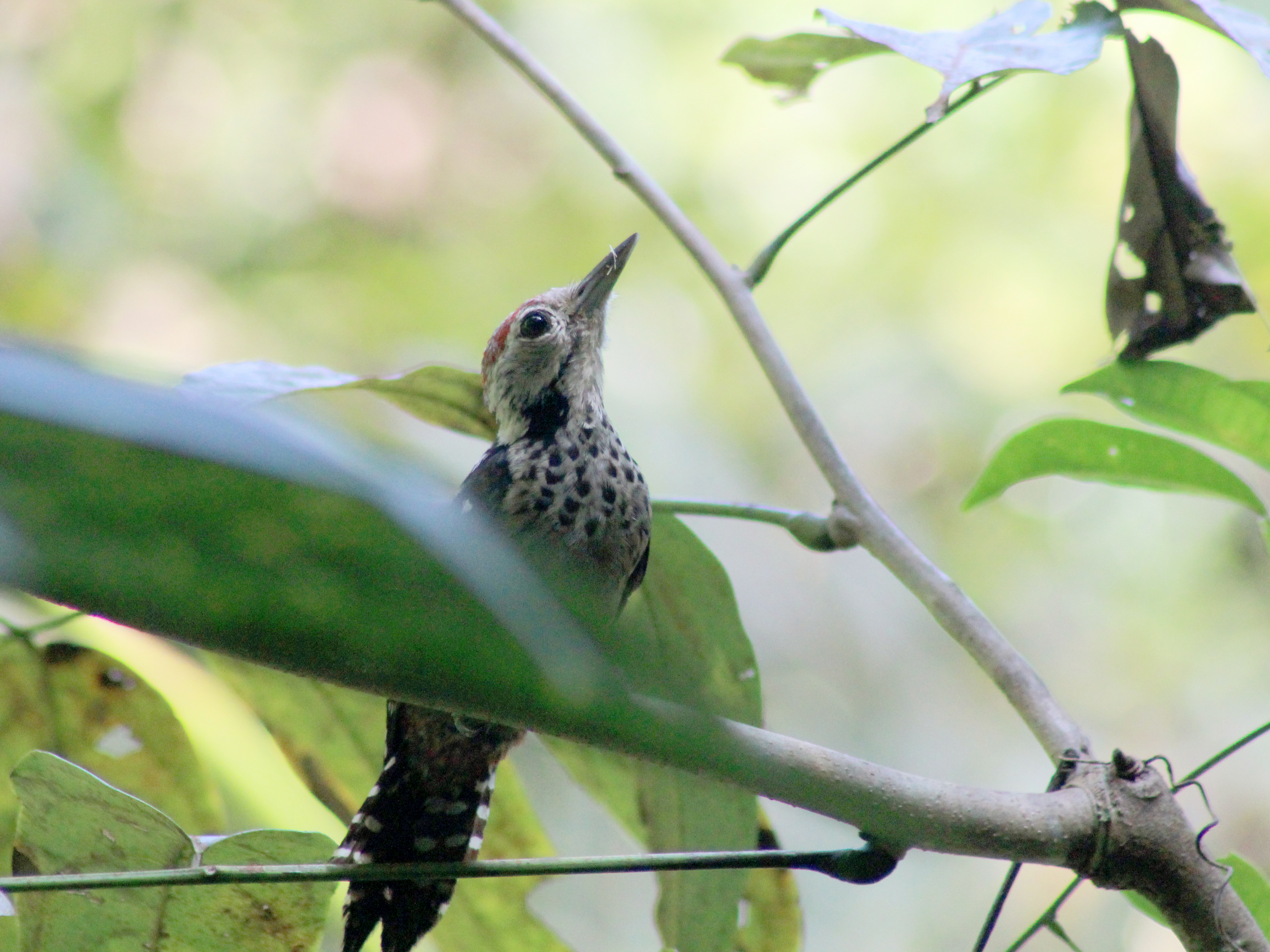
the Andamanese sub-species

It is a medium-sized, pied woodpecker. Its upper parts are black with heavily barred white. The undertail is red; the breast and belly are buff with light flank barring and slight side streaking. It has whitish cheeks partly bordered by a black line. The male's crown is red with an orange forehead; the female's is black.

== Habitat ==
Its natural habitats are subtropical or tropical dry forest, subtropical or tropical moist lowland forest, and subtropical or tropical moist montane forest.
