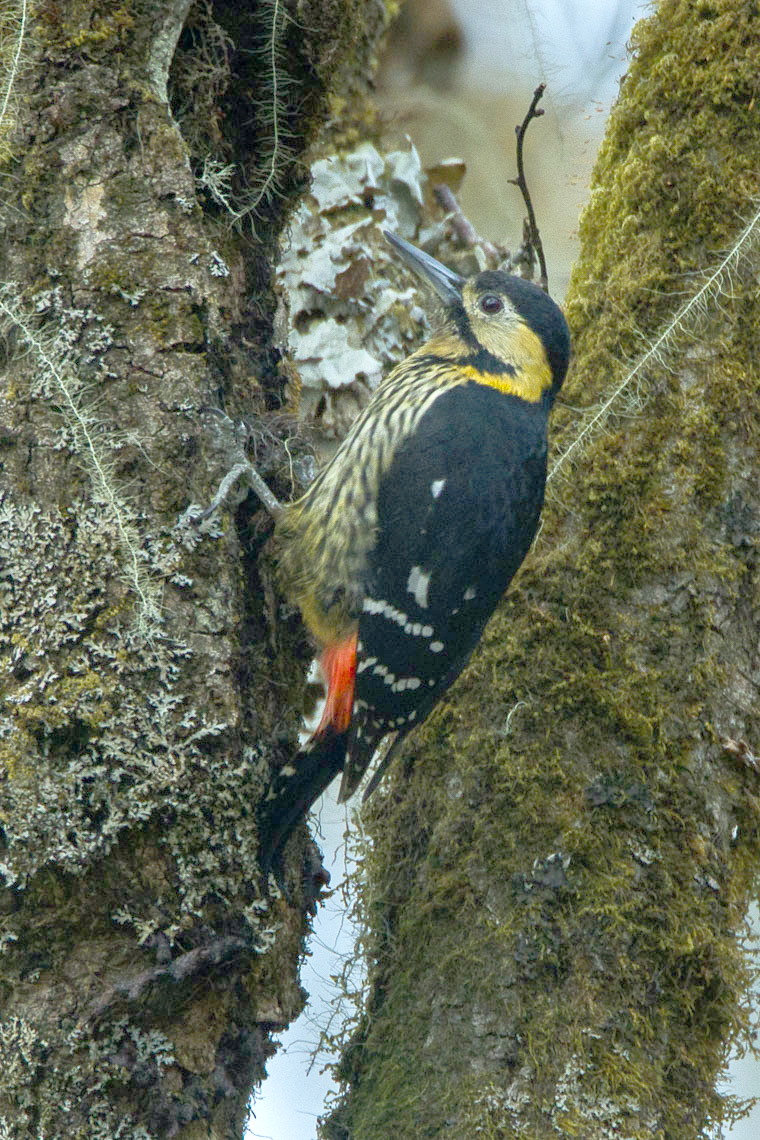

Conservation status
- Least Concern (IUCN 3.1)

Scientific classification
- Kingdom: Animalia
- Phylum: Chordata
- Class: Aves
- Order: Piciformes
- Family: Picidae
- Genus: Dendrocopos
- Species: D. darjellensis

Binomial name
- Dendrocopos darjellensis (Blyth, 1845)

= Darjeeling woodpecker =

Species of bird

The Darjeeling woodpecker (Dendrocopos darjellensis) is a species of bird in the family Picidae. It is found in the northern regions of the Indian subcontinent, primarily in the Himalayas, and in some adjoining areas.

== Description ==
A medium-sized pied woodpecker with yellow neck sides. Black upperparts with large white, scapular patches and white barred flight feathers and tail sides. Male has red nape patch. White cheeks and long black moustache extending to upper breast. Black-streaked, yellow-buff below with red vent. Long bill.

== Distribution ==
It is found in Bhutan, India, Myanmar, Nepal and Tibet. Its natural habitats are subtropical or tropical moist lowland forest and subtropical or tropical moist montane forest.

== Gallery ==
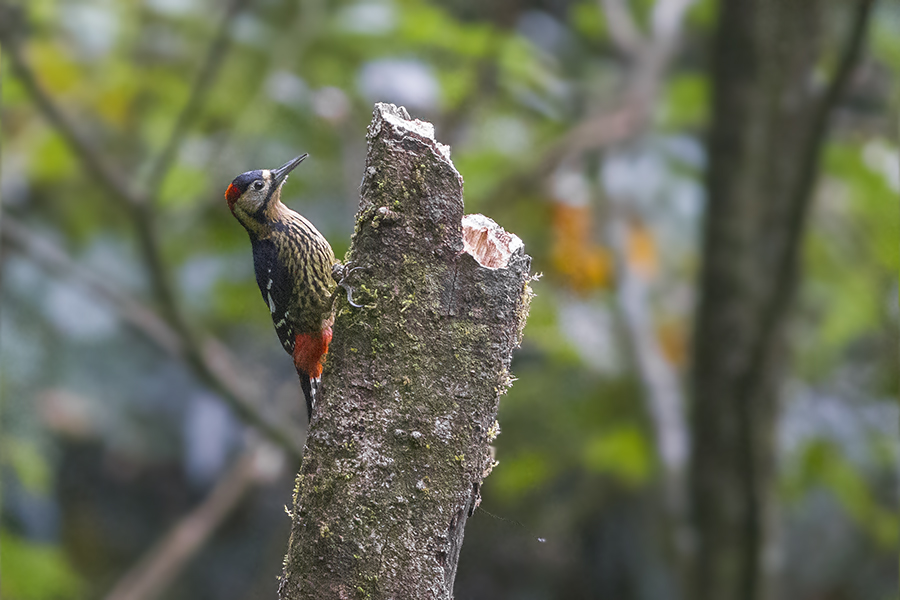
Dendrocopos darjellensis from Khangchendzonga National Park, West Sikkim, India.

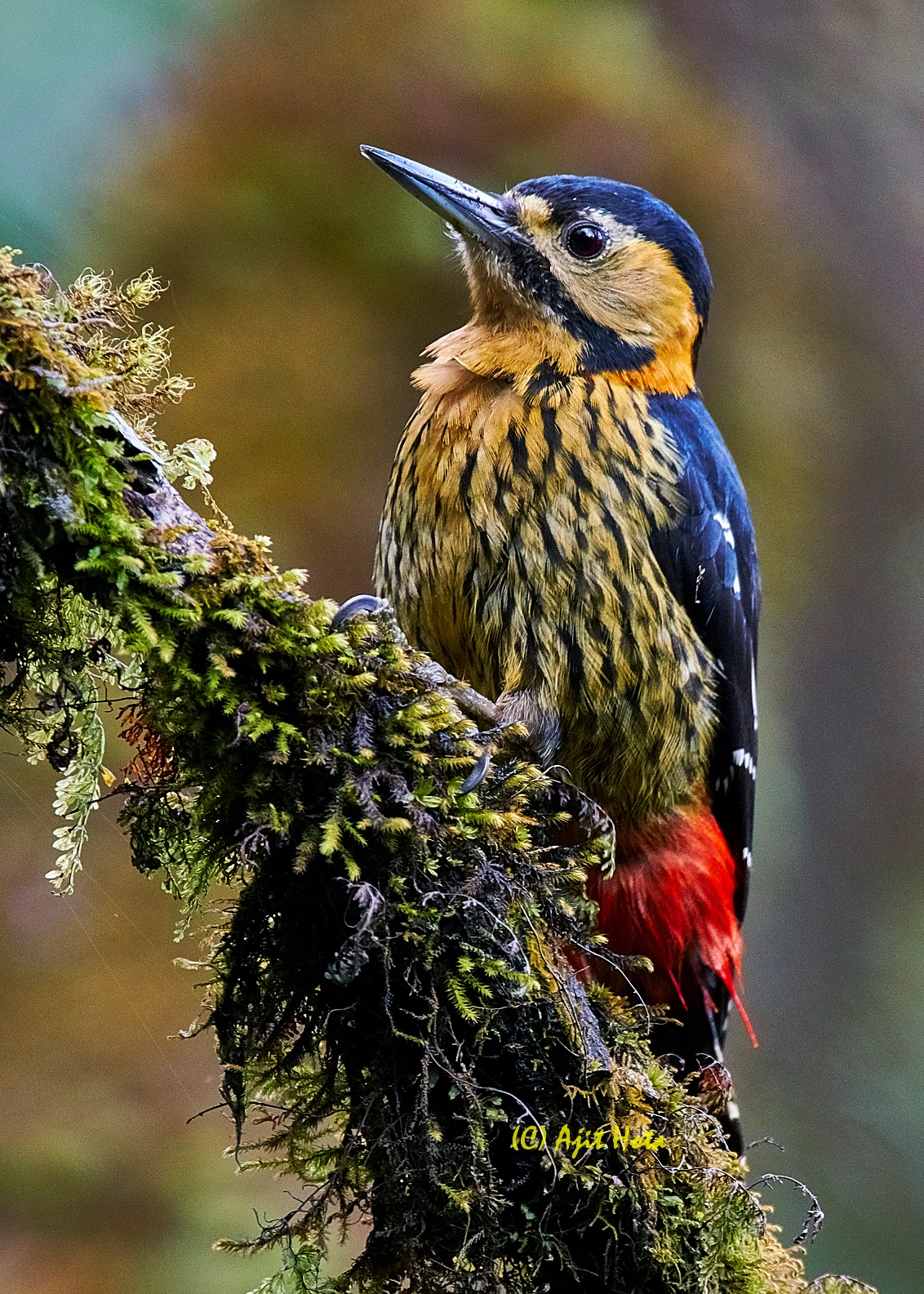
Darjeeling Woodpecker at Singalila National Park, West Bengal, India
