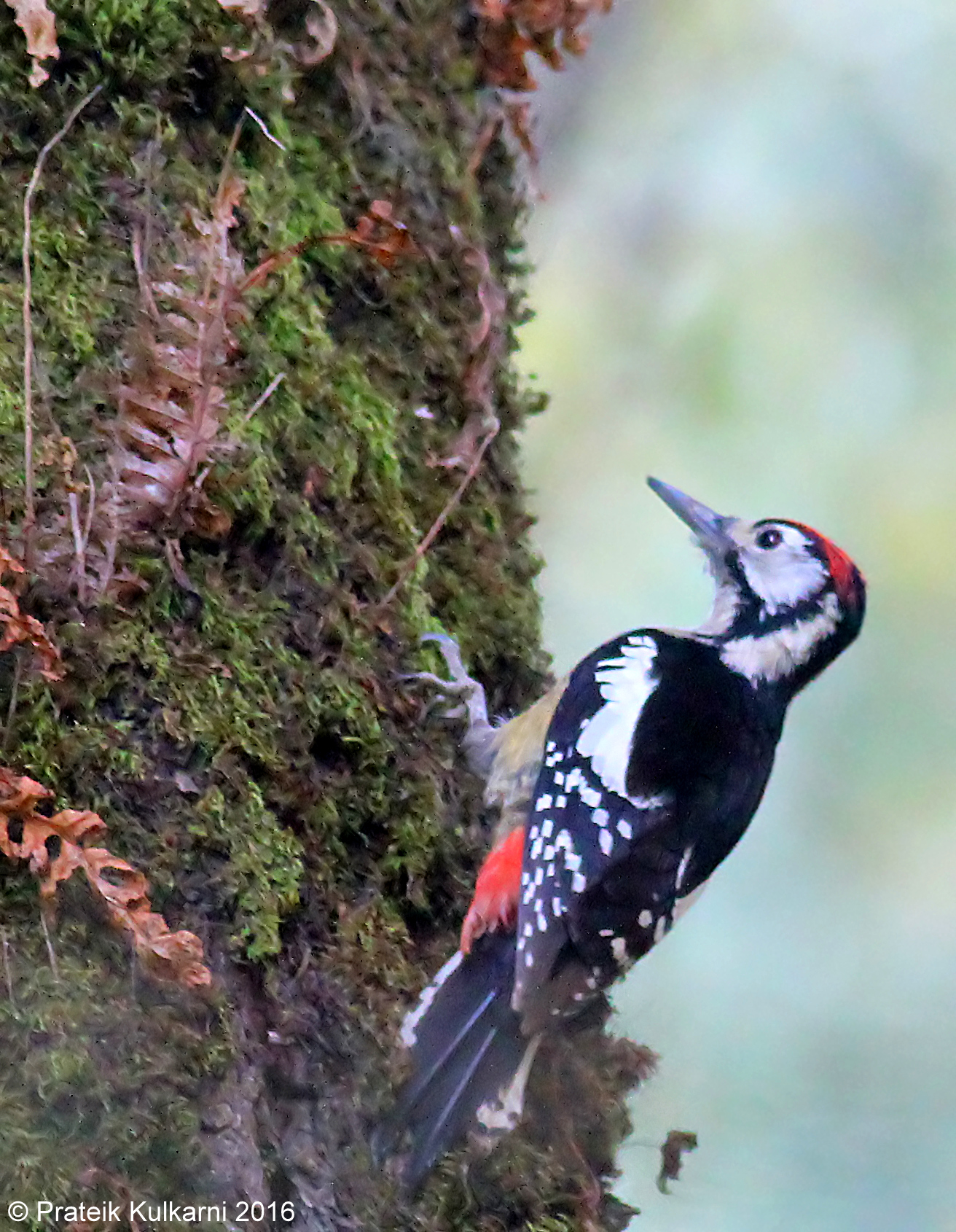
- Male at Pangot in Nainital district of Uttarakhand, India

Conservation status
- Least Concern (IUCN 3.1)

Scientific classification
- Kingdom: Animalia
- Phylum: Chordata
- Class: Aves
- Order: Piciformes
- Family: Picidae
- Genus: Dendrocopos
- Species: D. himalayensis

Binomial name
- Dendrocopos himalayensis (Jardine & Selby, 1831)

= Himalayan woodpecker =

Species of bird

The Himalayan woodpecker (Dendrocopos himalayensis) is a species of bird in the family Picidae. It is found in the northern regions of the Indian subcontinent, primarily the Himalayas and some adjoining areas, and ranges across Afghanistan, India, Nepal, Bhutan and Pakistan. Its natural habitats are boreal forests and temperate forests. The International Union for Conservation of Nature has assessed its conservation status as being of "least concern".

== Description ==
A medium-sized, pied woodpecker reaching a length of about 24 cm (9 in). Glossy black above with broad white patches from shoulder to lower back, limited white barring on flight feathers and clean white tail edgings. Underparts and head white or plain pale buff with black Y-shaped mark on neck and cheeks. The crown is red in males and black in females. Black marks under eyes are unique and distinguish it from other species. Vent and under-tail coverts red or pink. Iris chestnut, beak blackish and legs grey. The juvenile is duller, greyish-black above, and with vent and under-tail areas less vivid and crown greyish with some red (in both sexes).

== Ecology ==
The Himalayan woodpecker is found at altitudes between 1,500 and 3,200 m (4,900 and 10,500 ft). Its habitat is either wet or dry upland forest with either deciduous or coniferous trees, and often with rhododendrons. It forages individually, usually on trunks and large branches but sometimes on the ground. Its diet is varied, with insects, fruits, seeds and sap. It sometimes hammers fir cones on stones to extract the seeds.

== Status ==
The Himalayan woodpecker has a wide range and is generally a common or fairly common bird. No particular threats have been recognized and the population trend is thought to be steady. The International Union for Conservation of Nature has assessed its conservation status as being of "least concern".

== Gallery ==
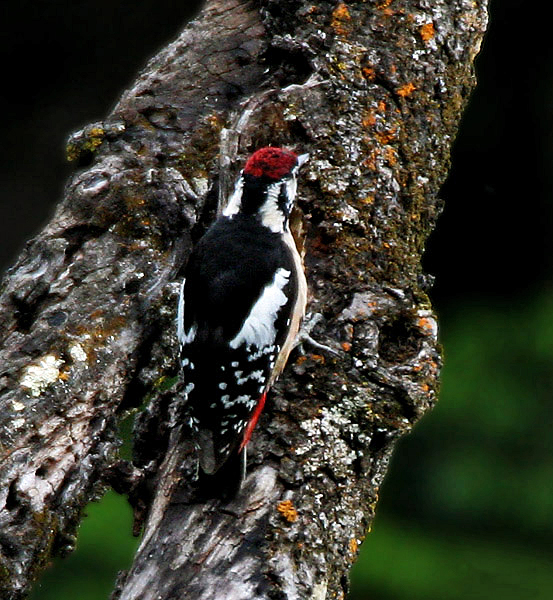
Male at Bhandakthaatch (8,500 ft.) in Kullu - Manali District of Himachal Pradesh, India

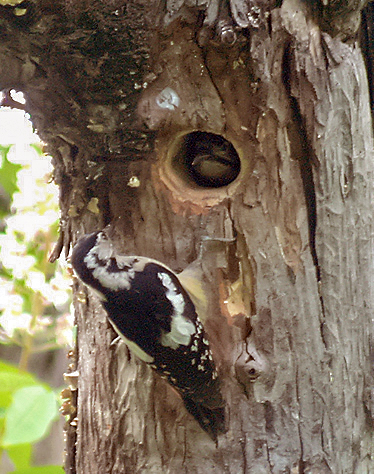
Pair at nest in Kullu - Manali District of Himachal Pradesh, India

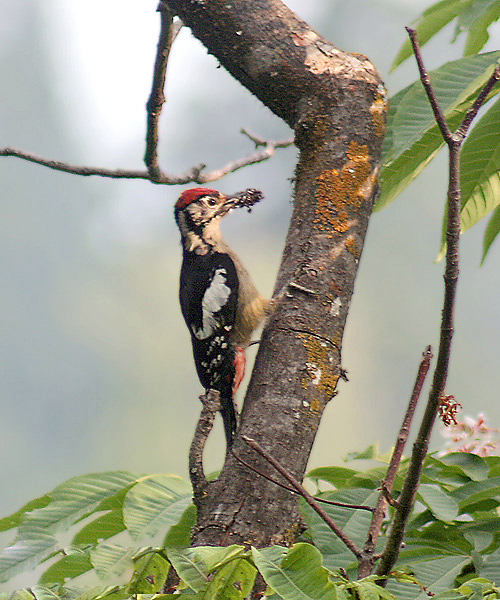
Male carrying food in Kullu - Manali District of Himachal Pradesh, India

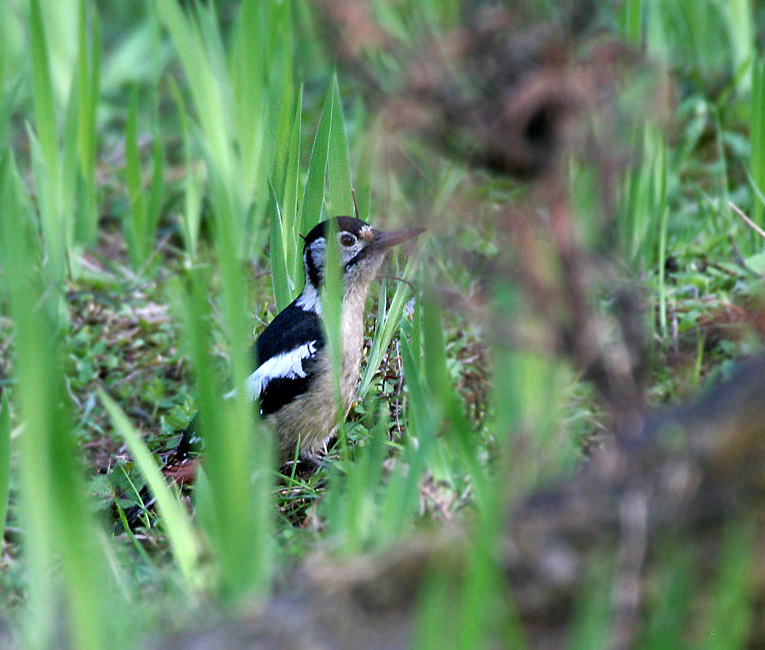
Female at ground at Guna Pani (8,500 ft.) in Kullu - Manali District of Himachal Pradesh, India
