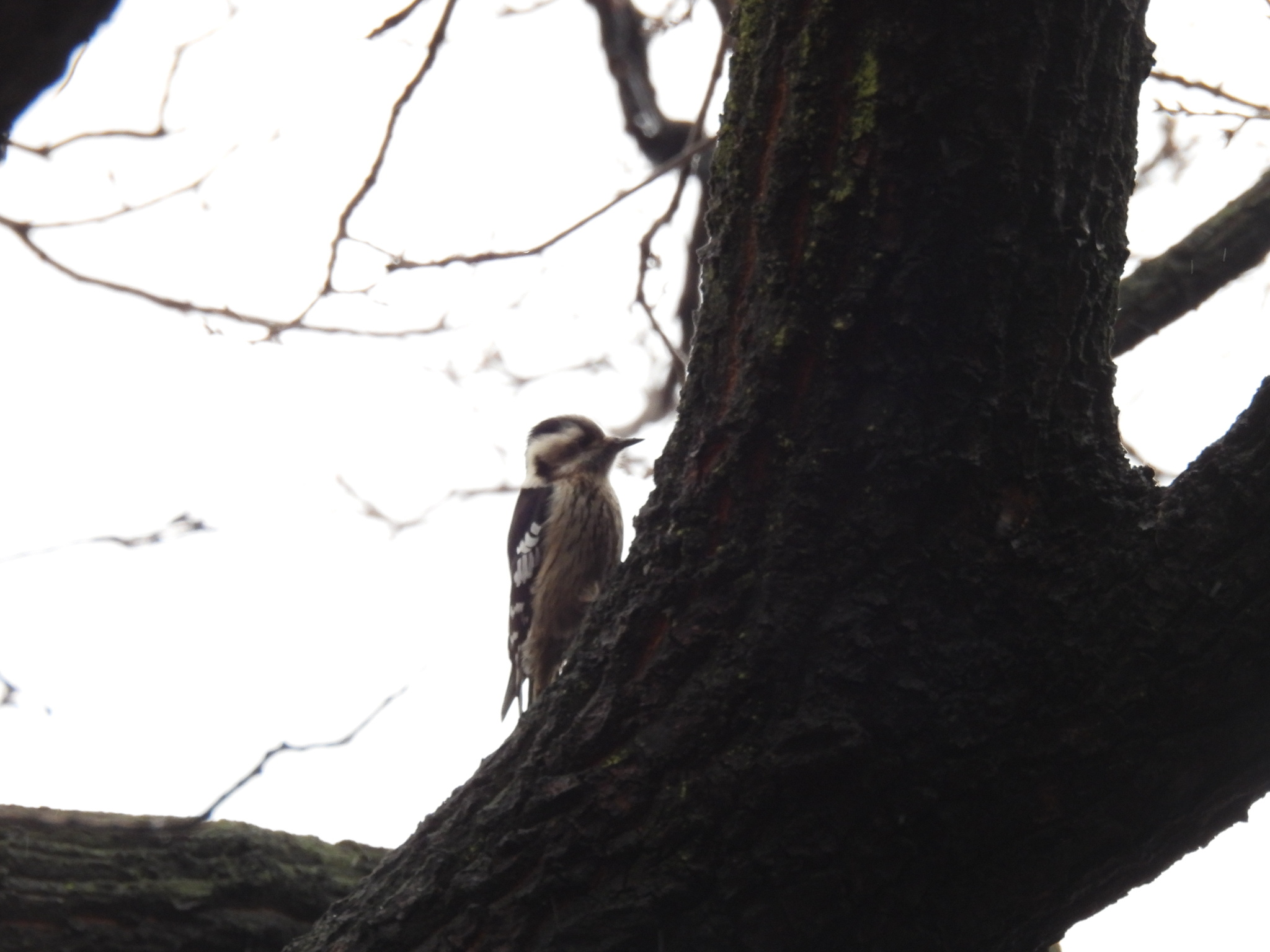

Scientific classification
- Kingdom: Animalia
- Phylum: Chordata
- Class: Aves
- Order: Piciformes
- Family: Picidae
- Genus: Yungipicus
- Species: Y. canicapillus
- Subspecies: Y. c. doerriesi

Trinomial name
- Yungipicus canicapillus doerriesi (Hargitt, 1881)

Synonyms
- Iyngipicus doerriesi Dendrocopos canicapillus doerriesi (Hargitt, 1881); Picoides canicapillus doerriesi

= Doerries's pygmy woodpecker =

Subspecies of bird

Doerries's pygmy woodpecker (Yungipicus canicapillus doerriesi) is an Asian bird subspecies of the woodpecker family (Picidae) and species P. canicapillus. The woodpecker is named after Fritz Doerries, a German lepidopterist, collector, and explorer of Siberia, where the bird was first discovered.

== Taxonomy ==
The first specimens of this subspecies were found on the island of Askold, located in eastern Siberia. They were collected and later classified under the name Iyngipicus doerriesi. John Gould obtained two specimens that he used to draw a lithograph for his collection. They were a cock from Henry Seebohm and a hen from Edward Hargitt, who was the first to write a description of the species in 1881. Some taxonomic authorities continue to place this subspecies in the genus Dendrocopos or Picoides. It has been placed within the genus Yungipicus. As part of Yungipicus canicapillus, which along with Y. temminckii, Y. kizuki, Y. maculatus, Y. ramsayi, Y. nanus, and Y. moluccensis, it was previously placed in the genus Dendrocopos.

== Description ==
It is a subspecies of the grey-capped pygmy woodpecker, with key differences in the color of its feathers and body. Adult individuals typically reach 18 centimetres (7.1 in) in length. The sides of the head and eyebrows have broad patches of intense white, and the wing coverts contain large clear white patterns that form conspicuous patches. The underparts of the wing are pale with five white stripes. The cock has a grey crown and two small red stripes featuring prominently above the eyebrows.

== Distribution and habitat ==
The subspecies' geographic distribution spans from eastern Siberia (Ussuriland), southeastern Manchuria (Heilongjiang and Jilin), and the Korean Peninsula. Individuals of this species live in open woods and cultivated lands (usually inland), and are believed to be extant throughout their range.
