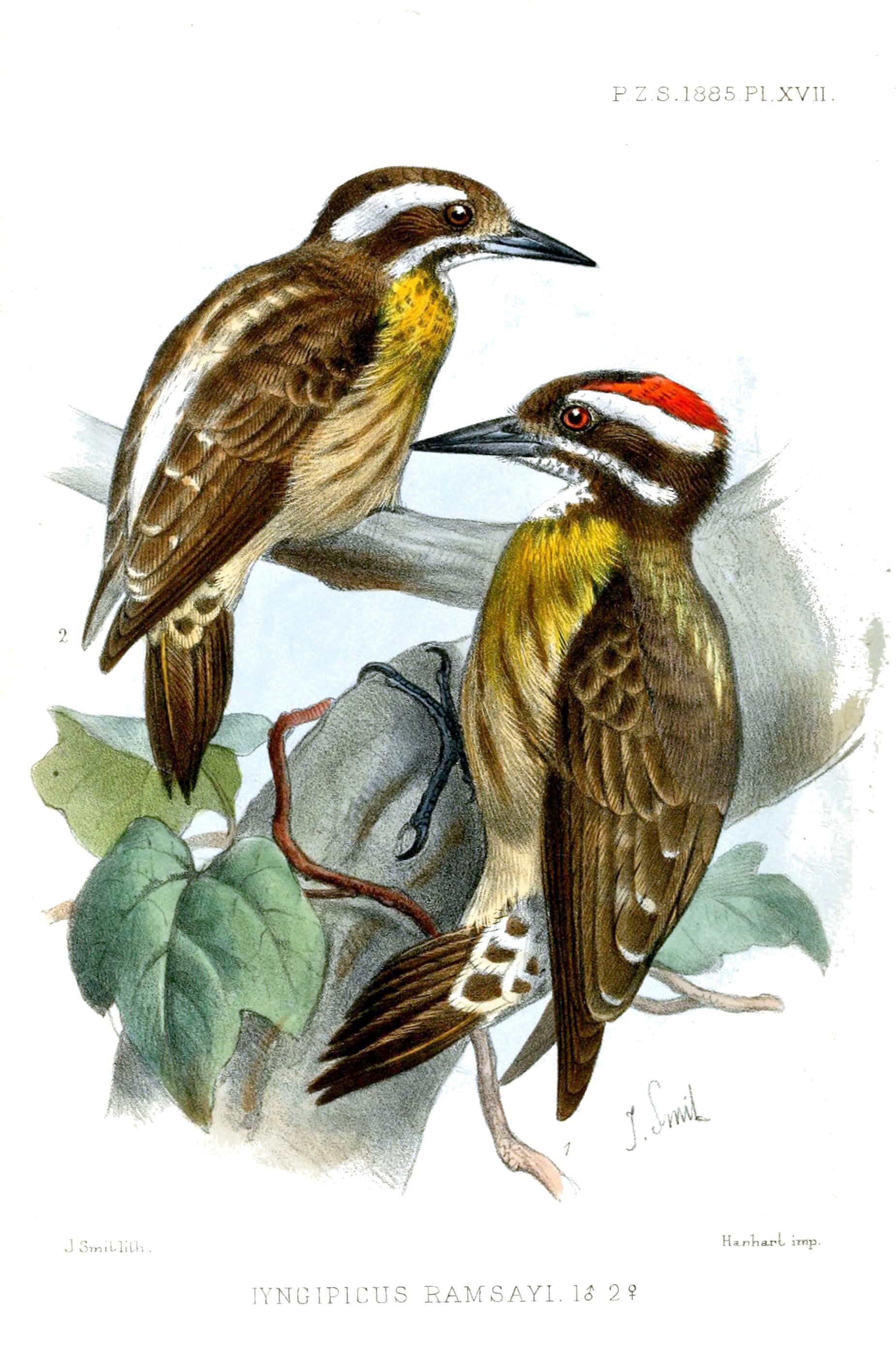

Conservation status
- Vulnerable (IUCN 3.1)

Scientific classification
- Kingdom: Animalia
- Phylum: Chordata
- Class: Aves
- Order: Piciformes
- Family: Picidae
- Genus: Yungipicus
- Species: Y. ramsayi

Binomial name
- Yungipicus ramsayi Hargitt, 1881

Synonyms
- Picoides ramsayi Dendrocopos ramsayi (Hargitt, 1881)

= Sulu pygmy woodpecker =

Species of bird

The Sulu pygmy woodpecker (Yungipicus ramsayi), also known as the Sulu woodpecker, is a species of bird in the family Picidae. It was formerly conspecific with the Philippine pygmy woodpecker. It is endemic to the Philippines found only on the Sulu Archipelago. Its natural habitats are tropical moist lowland forest, tropical mangrove forest, and arable land. It is threatened by habitat loss.

== Description and taxonomy ==
It is a small species of woodpecker of lowland forest and plantation in the Sulu Archipelago. It has a dark brown back with some white spotting.It has alternating brown and white facial stripes. The underparts are mostly white with a light brown wash close to its shoulder and chest. This species is sexual dimorphic in which males have a red hind-crown while the female's crown is entirely brown.

The species is named after Captain Wardlaw Ramsay from whose collection the species was described by Hargitt. Specimens were claimed to have been obtained from Borneo but the locality was not certain until new specimens were obtained from Sulu Island by Guillemard.

Formerly lumped with the Philippine pygmy woodpecker (Y. maculatus), it seems to form a superspecies with this and the Sulawesi pygmy woodpecker (Y. temminckii). Some taxonomic authorities continue to place this species in the genus Dendrocopos or Picoides. The entirely of the genus Yungipicus was once places in Dendrocopos but was separated by molecular and genetic studies.

== Ecology and behavior ==
The security situation in the Sulu archipelago has prevented researchers from studying this bird. It is pressumed to have a similar diet as the Philippine pygmy woodpecker and Sunda pygmy woodpecker both of which feed on insects. Forages alone or in pairs but also joins mixed flocks. This species is observed foraging on dead tree branches.

There is no information at all on its breeding habits.

== Habitat and conservation status ==
It inhabits forest clearings, forest edge, mangroves and cultivated areas, in addition to primary forest, although it has been speculated that it avoids dense forest. It is seen in altitudes up to 550 meters above sea level. However, its habitat preferences are poorly understood. Its tolerance of degraded habitats implies that it should be more numerous than is the case.

The IUCN Red List classifies this bird as a vulnerable with population estimates of 2,500 to 9,999 mature individuals. Although this species is supposedly more tolerant of habitat degradation, it is still threatened by habitat loss with wholesale clearance of forest habitats as a result of legal and illegal logging, mining, conversion into farmlands or palm oil plantations and urbanization. Due to the rapid loss of habitat in the Sulu Archipelago, many of the birds endemic to the region like the Sulu hornbill, Tawitawi brown dove, Blue-winged racket-tail, Sulu hawk-owl are all threatened with extinction.

There are no species specific conservation programs going on at the moment but conservation actions proposed include more species surveys to better understand habitat and population. Lobby for protection of remaining forest. Continue to expand environmental awareness programs and raise the species profile and instill pride in locals
