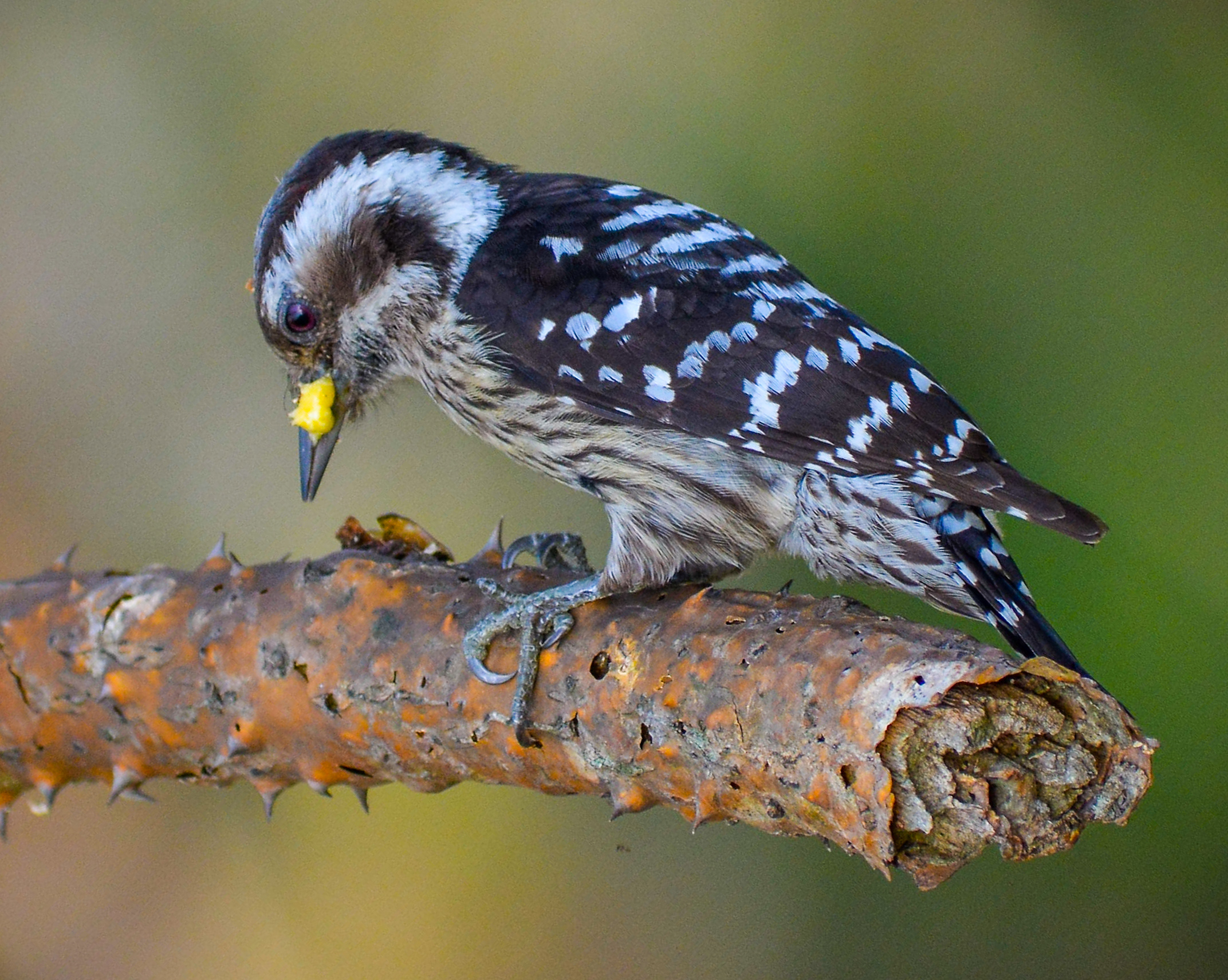

Conservation status
- Least Concern (IUCN 3.1)

Scientific classification
- Kingdom: Animalia
- Phylum: Chordata
- Class: Aves
- Order: Piciformes
- Family: Picidae
- Genus: Yungipicus
- Species: Y. canicapillus

Binomial name
- Yungipicus canicapillus (Blyth, 1845)

Synonyms
- Picoides canicapillus Dryobates semicoronatus Dendrocopus canicapillus

= Grey-capped pygmy woodpecker =

Species of bird

The grey-capped pygmy woodpecker (Yungipicus canicapillus) is an Asian bird species of the woodpecker family (Picidae). It has a subspecies, Yungipicus canicapillus doerriesi, located primarily in Manchuria, eastern Siberia, and Korea. Some taxonomic authorities continue to place this species in the genus Dendrocopos or Picoides.

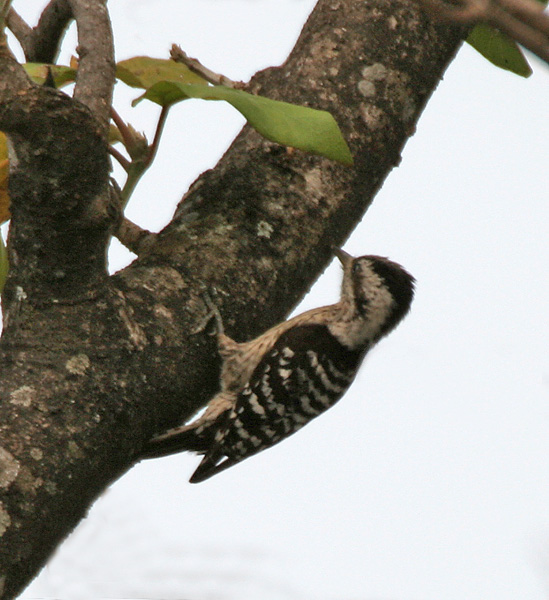
Female at Jayanti in the Buxa Tiger Reserve

This is a small, dark woodpecker with dark irides. Barred black and white above, it usually has unbarred central tail feathers. Its dark buff underside has prominent dark streaking. The dark grey crown (with a red nape in males), strong black eyestripes, and thin dark malar stripes contrast with broad white supercilia and cheeks.

Its range extends from the Himalayas and Manchuria to Southeast Asia. Its natural habitats are subtropical or tropical moist lowland forest, subtropical or tropical mangrove forest, and subtropical or tropical moist montane forest.
