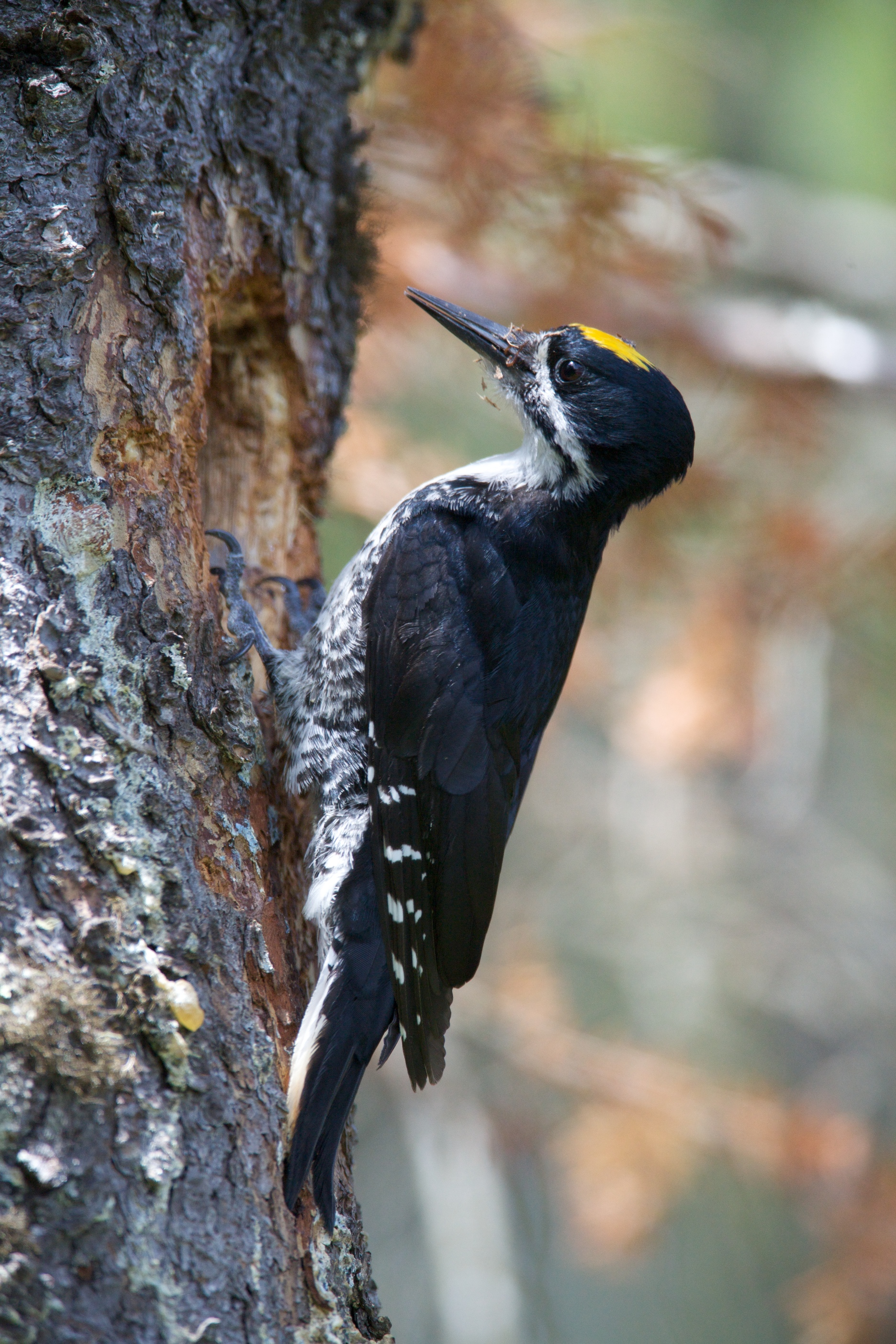
- Male in Brunswick, Vermont, United States
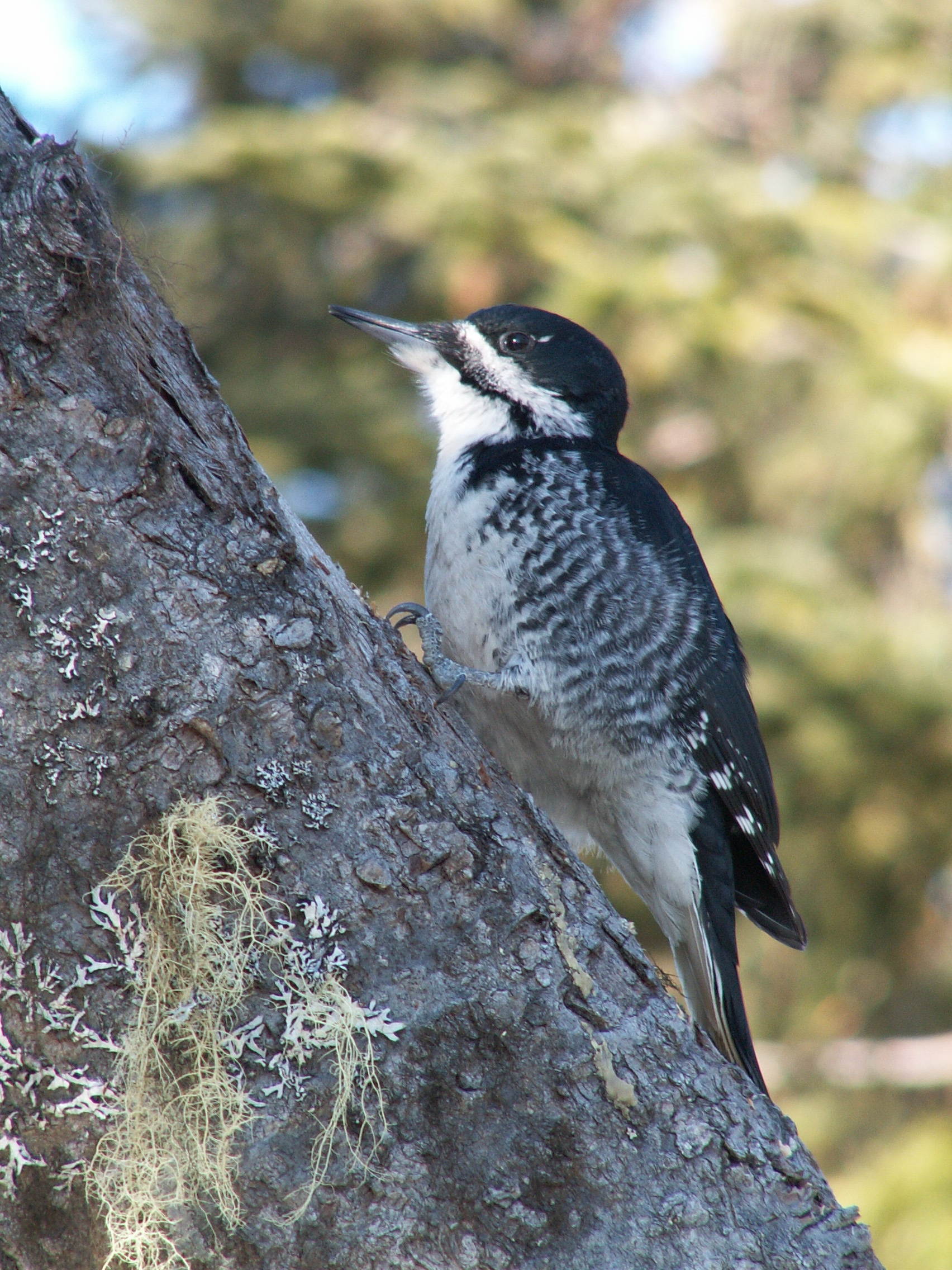
- Female in Quebec, Canada

Conservation status
- Least Concern (IUCN 3.1)

Scientific classification
- Kingdom: Animalia
- Phylum: Chordata
- Class: Aves
- Order: Piciformes
- Family: Picidae
- Genus: Picoides
- Species: P. arcticus

Binomial name
- Picoides arcticus (Swainson, 1832)
- Approximate distribution map Year-round

= Black-backed woodpecker =

Species of bird

The black-backed woodpecker (Picoides arcticus), also known as the Arctic three-toed woodpecker, is a medium-sized woodpecker (23 cm (9.1 in) long) inhabiting the forests of North America.

== Taxonomy ==
The black-backed woodpecker was described and illustrated by the English naturalist William Swainson in 1832 from a specimen collected near the source of the Athabasca River on the eastern slopes of the Rocky Mountains in Alberta, Canada. He coined the binomial name Picus arcticus. The specific epithet arcticus is the Latin word for "northern" or "arctic". The black-backed woodpecker is now placed in the genus Picoides which was erected by the French naturalist Bernard Germain de Lacépède in 1799. The species is monotypic: no subspecies are recognised.

== Description ==
The plumage of adults is black on the head, back, wings and rump. They are white from the throat to the belly; the flanks are white with black bars. Their tail is black with white outer feathers. There is an element of sexual dimorphism in the plumage, with the adult male possessing a yellow cap. Unlike all other true woodpeckers except the related American and Eurasian three-toed woodpeckers, this species has three-toed feet.

Measurements:

- Length: 9.1 inches (23 cm)
- Weight: 2.1–3.1 oz (60–88 g)
- Wingspan: 15.8–16.5 in (40–42 cm)

== Habitat and breeding ==
Their breeding range is boreal forest across Canada, Alaska, the Northwestern United States, as well as northern Wisconsin, the Adirondacks in New York, New England, Minnesota, and Upper Michigan. In particular the species is a burnt-forest specialist, feeding on the outbreaks of wood-boring beetles that feed on recently burnt trees. The most important wood boring beetles taken are in the families Cerambycidae and Buprestidae, along with engraver beetles and the mountain pine beetle. Most food is obtained by pecking, a smaller proportion is obtained by gleaning off branches. Black-backed woodpeckers are generally non-migratory but historically have undertaken intermittent irruptions.

Nest excavation occurs in April and May; a fresh nest is drilled each year into the sapwood of dead trees. Abandoned nests are used by other species of bird to nest in. The female lays three or four eggs, and incubation duties are shared between both parents, although the male alone incubates during the night. Upon hatching the altricial chicks are brooded until the nestling phase. Both parents feed the chicks, which take about 24 days to fledge.

== Vocalization ==
The call note of the black-backed woodpecker is a single, sharp pik, and is lower pitched than the call of the American three-toed woodpecker.
