= Tündre Nature Reserve =

Protected area in Estonia

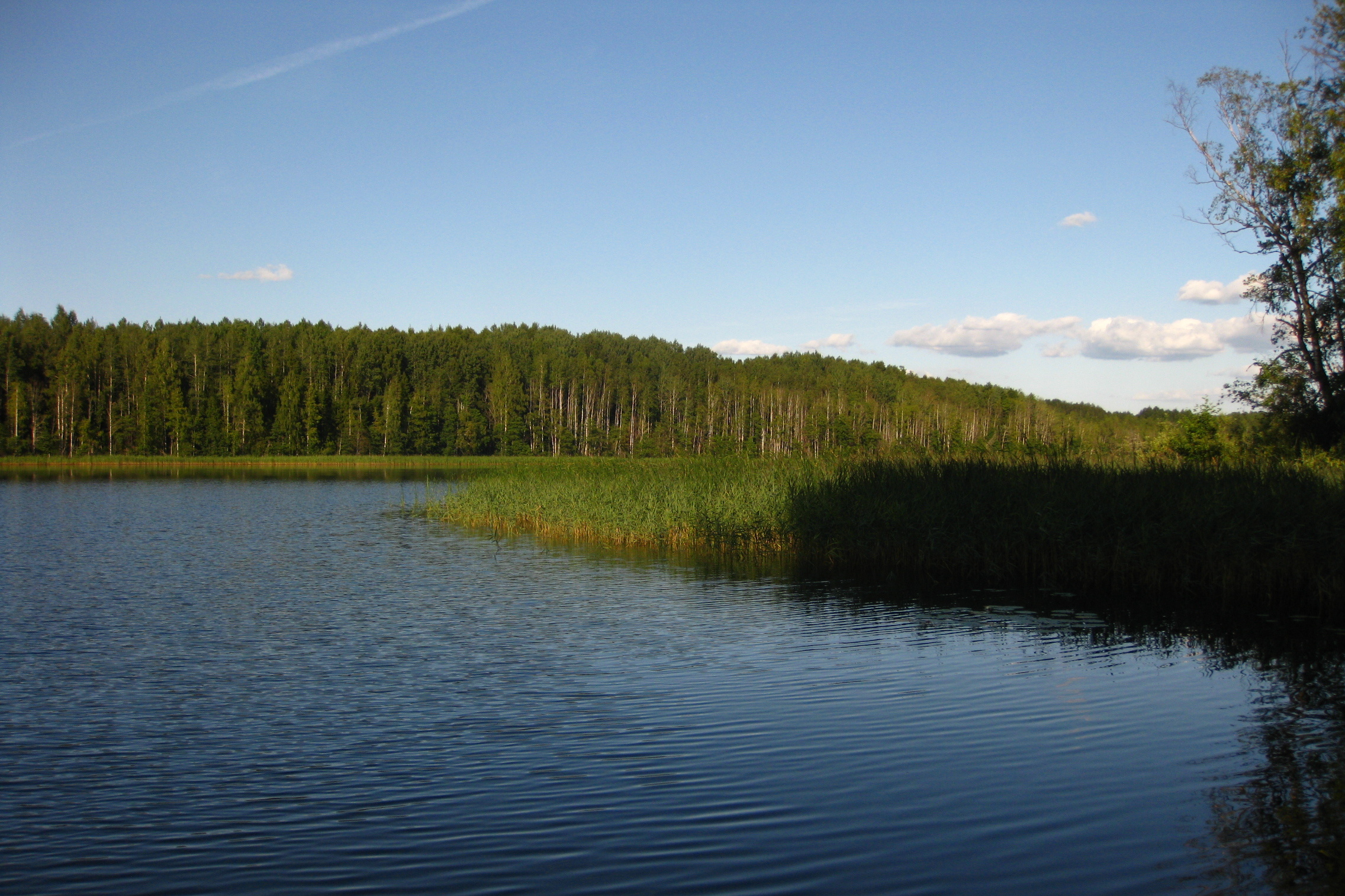

- Location within Estonia
- Location: Estonia
- Coordinates: 57°57′52″N 25°35′47″E
- Area: 1,837 ha (4,540 acres)
- Established: 1999

Tündre Nature Reserve is a nature reserve situated in southern Estonia, straddling the border between Viljandi and Valga County.

Tündre Nature Reserve serves to protect an area of swamp forest in which several species of bird, notably osprey, capercaillie and three-toed woodpecker, as well as some species of fungi have their habitat.
