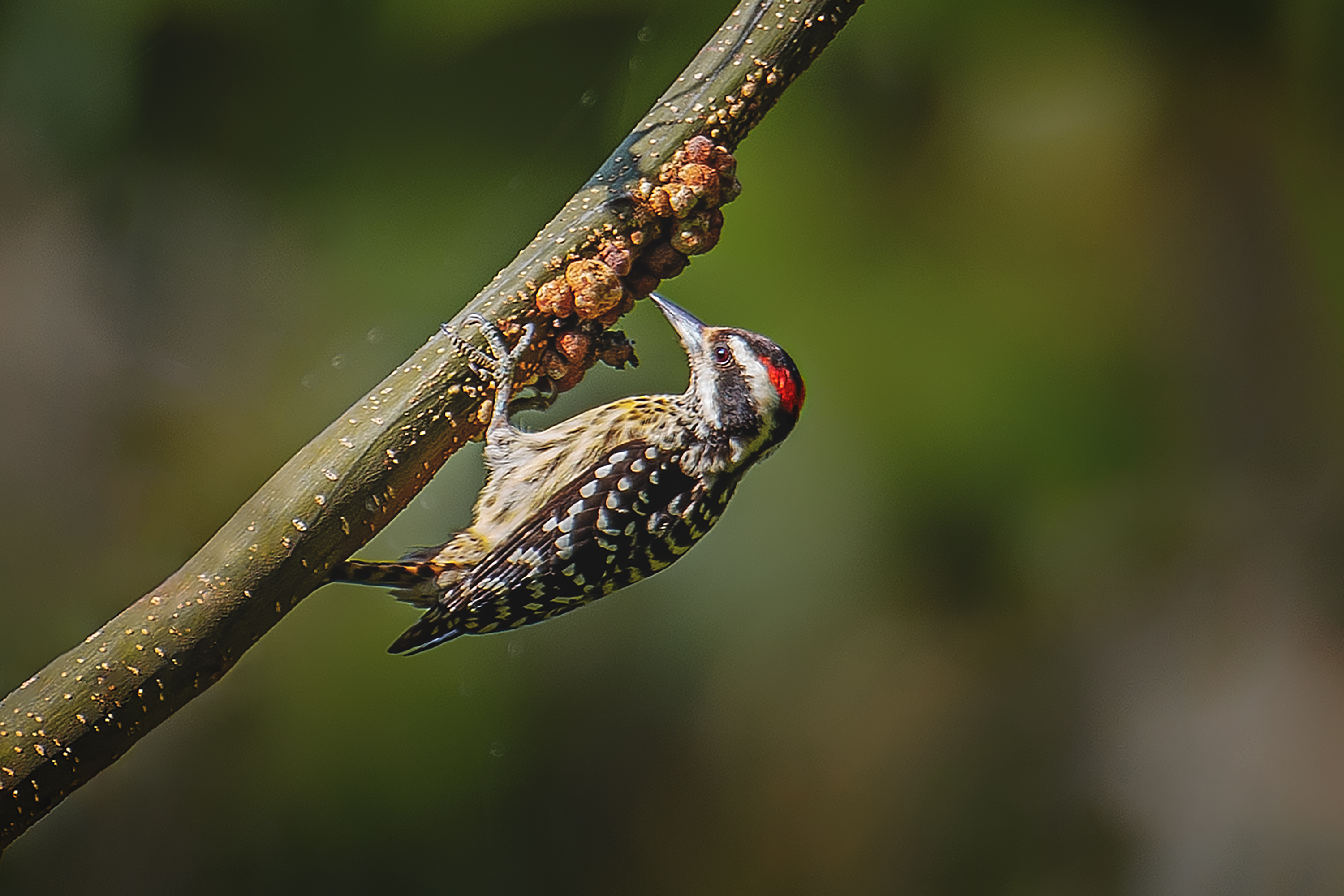

Conservation status
- Least Concern (IUCN 3.1)

Scientific classification
- Kingdom: Animalia
- Phylum: Chordata
- Class: Aves
- Order: Piciformes
- Family: Picidae
- Genus: Yungipicus
- Species: Y. maculatus

Binomial name
- Yungipicus maculatus (Scopoli, 1786)

Synonyms
- Dendrocopos maculatus Picoides maculatus

= Philippine pygmy woodpecker =

Species of bird

The Philippine pygmy woodpecker (Yungipicus maculatus), also known as the Philippine woodpecker, is a species of bird in the woodpecker family (Picidae). Its local name in Kapampangan is Anluage. It is endemic to the Philippines, found throughout the entire country except the Sulu Archipelago and Palawan. It is the smallest woodpecker in the country and is common throughout, found even in urban areas in cities.

== Description and taxonomy ==
Formerly the taxon included the Sulu pygmy woodpecker, which is now treated as distinct. These two and the Sulawesi pygmy woodpecker appear to form a superspecies. Some taxonomic authorities continue to place this species in the genus Dendrocopos or Picoides.

=== Subspecies ===
Three subspecies are recognized:

- Y. m. maculatus — Found on Sibuyan, Panay, Gigantes, Guimaras, Negros and Cebu
- Y. m. validirostris — Found on Luzon, Lubang, Marinduque, Mindoro and Catanduanes; shorter-tailed than nominate, darker above, barred rump, distinct white supercilium usually, male with red reduced to small line on hindcrown side
- Y. m. fulvifasciatus — Found on Samar, Leyte, Bohol, Dinagat, Mindanao and Basilan; darkest in plummage, white rump, white ear coverts and buff wash below

Other named races are menagei (Sibuyan), leytensis (Samar, Calicoan, Leyte, Bohol) and apo (Mt Apo, on Mindanao), all considered insufficiently distinct and have been merged with the existing subspecies.

== Behaviour and ecology ==
Philippine pygmy woodpeckers feed mostly on insects. They are found singly, in pairs, and in small groups of up to 5, as well as sometimes joining mixed-species flocks that include Elegant tit, Sulphur-billed nuthatch, White-eyes and other small birds. They forage high up trees on twigs and smaller branches. They favor dead trees, where they typically peck and hammer before searching for food in bark and foliage

The species' breeding season is from February to August, during which it nests in holes in trees.

== Habitat and conservation status ==
It lives in primary or secondary forests, plantations, forest edge and even clearings with scattered trees and can be found at altitudes varying from up to 2,500 meters above sea level.

The IUCN Red List has assessed this bird as least-concern species as it is common throughout its range and is found throughout the entire Philippines. Its population is still said to be stable as it appears to be tolerant of degraded habitat.
