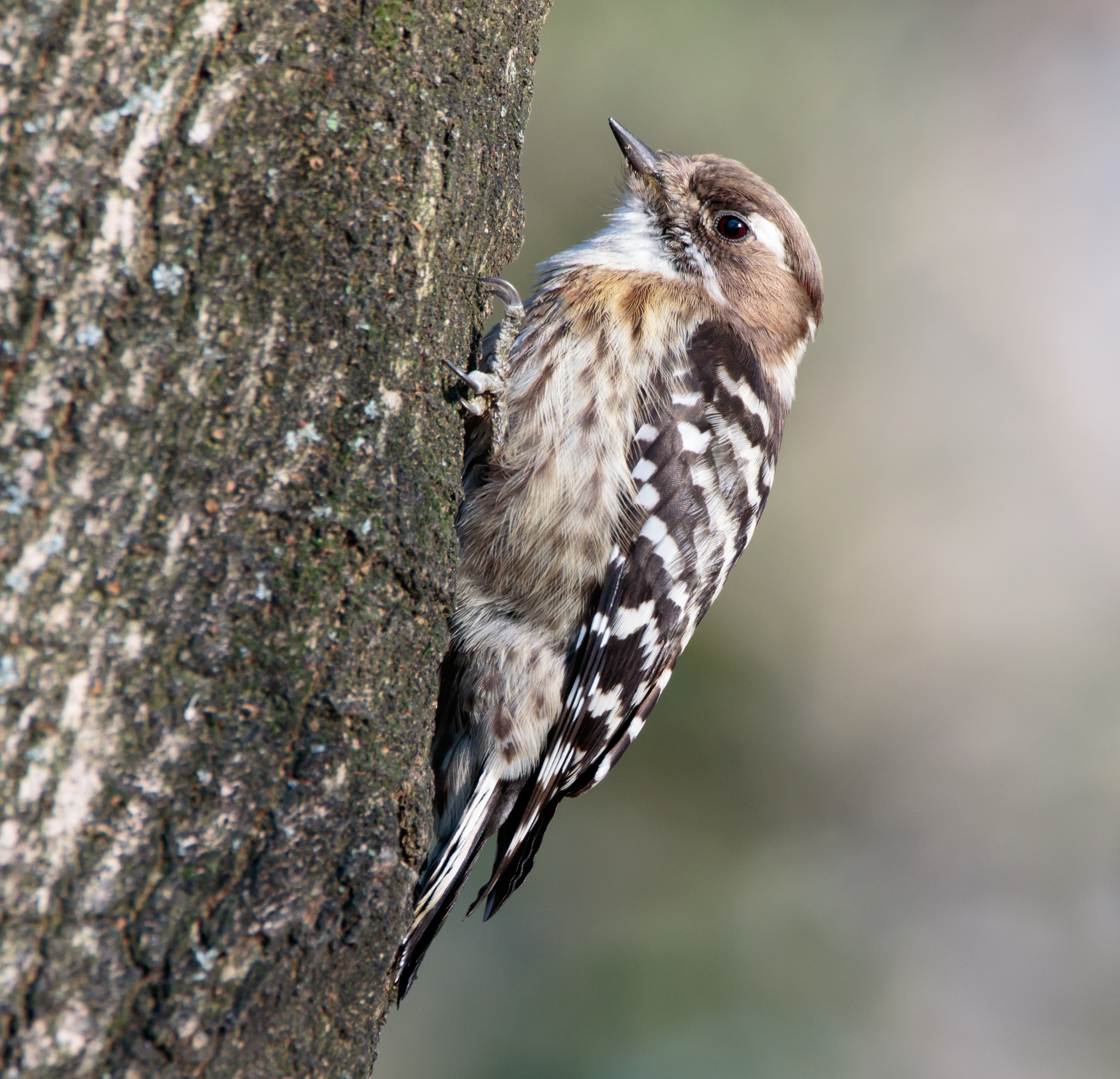

Conservation status
- Least Concern (IUCN 3.1)

Scientific classification
- Kingdom: Animalia
- Phylum: Chordata
- Class: Aves
- Order: Piciformes
- Family: Picidae
- Genus: Yungipicus
- Species: Y. kizuki

Binomial name
- Yungipicus kizuki (Temminck, 1836)

Synonyms
- Picoides kizuki; Dendrocopos kizuki

= Japanese pygmy woodpecker =

Species of bird

The Japanese pygmy woodpecker or simply pygmy woodpecker (Yungipicus kizuki) is a species of woodpecker. It is found in coniferous and deciduous forests in Russia, China, Korea and Japan. This species has also been placed in the genus Dendrocopos or Picoides. The International Union for Conservation of Nature (IUCN) has assessed it as a least-concern species.

== Taxonomy ==
This species was described by Temminck in 1836. The IOC World Bird List recognizes the following subspecies: Yungipicus kizuki permutatus, Y. k. seebohmi, Y. k. nippon, Y. k. shikokuensis, Y. k. kizuki (the nominate subspecies), Y. k. matsudairai, Y. k. kotataki, Y. k. amamii, Y. k. nigrescens and Y. k. orii. The species has previously been placed in genera Dendrocopos and Picoides.

== Description ==
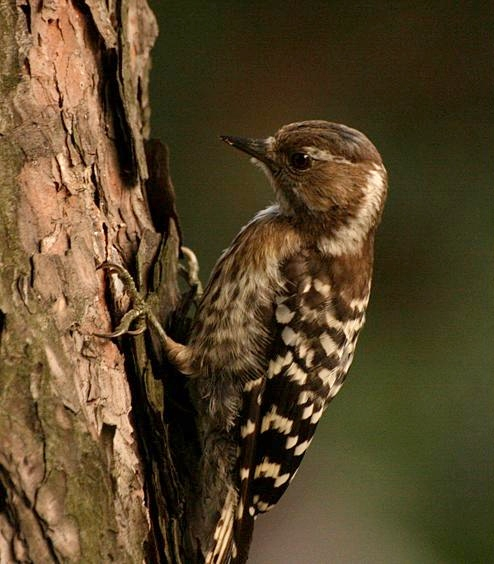
Pygmy woodpecker in South Korea

The Japanese pygmy woodpecker is 13–15 cm (5.1–5.9 in) long. The crown is grey-brown. A white supercilium starts above the eye and continues to the neck and breast. The ear coverts are brown, and there is a white moustachial stripe and a grey-brown malar stripe. The chin and throat are white. The mantle and back are dark brown, with white bars. The upperwing coverts and flight feathers are brownish-black and have white bars. The breast has a brownish suffusion. The breast, flank and belly have variable streaks. The tail is blackish, with white bars on its outer feathers. The iris is chestnut, the beak is blackish and the legs are grey. The male has a small red mark on the side of its nape, and the female does not. The female's beak, wings and tail are longer than the male's. The juvenile bird's throat is often streaked. The bird becomes smaller and darker from the north of its range to the south. Its call is a high "tsi-tsi-tsi" and it has a quick drum.

== Distribution and habitat ==
This woodpecker is found in Korea, northeastern China, southeastern Siberia, Sakhalin, Japan and the Ryukyu Islands. It occurs up to 2,100 m (6,900 ft) in elevation, and its habitat consists of many types of coniferous and deciduous forests, including lowland, upland and riverine forests, and also parks and gardens.

== Behaviour ==
The Japanese pygmy woodpecker occurs in pairs and mixed-species foraging flocks, searching on trees for invertebrates, such as spiders, caterpillars, ants and aphids, and berries. Its calls are khit and kzz notes, and it drums weakly in short bursts. Breeding starts in March in southern Japan and in late May in northern Japan. A nest hole is excavated in a dead branch. The eggs are white, measuring about 19 mm (0.75 in) by 15 mm (0.6 in). Five to seven white eggs are laid and then incubated for 12 to 14 days. Fledging occurs after three weeks.

== Status ==
The species has a large range and a stable population, so the IUCN has assessed it as a least-concern species.
