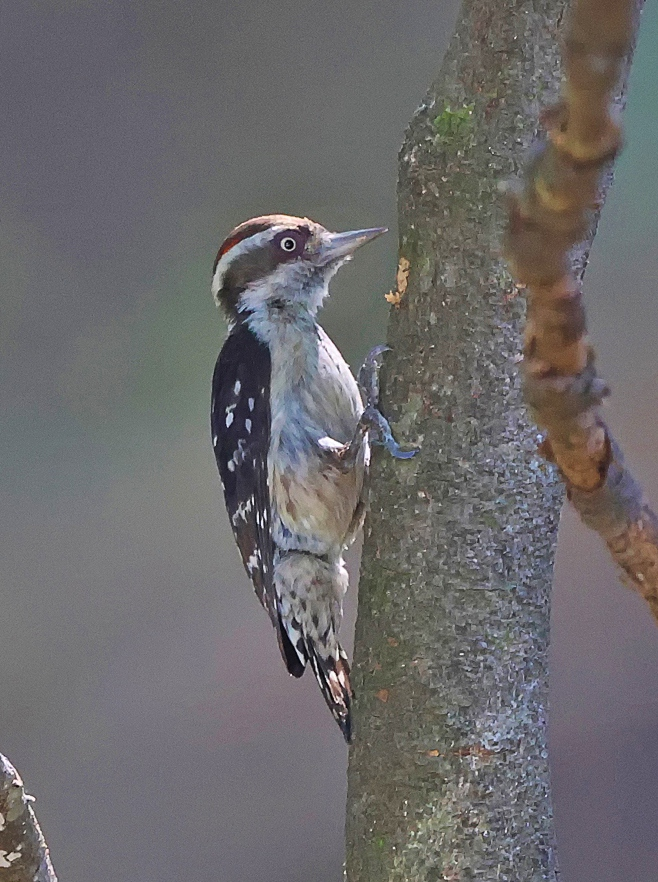
- Male with red streak on hindcrown

Conservation status
- Least Concern (IUCN 3.1)

Scientific classification
- Kingdom: Animalia
- Phylum: Chordata
- Class: Aves
- Order: Piciformes
- Family: Picidae
- Genus: Yungipicus
- Species: Y. nanus

Binomial name
- Yungipicus nanus (Vigors, 1832)

Synonyms
- Picoides nanus Dendrocopos nanus

= Brown-capped pygmy woodpecker =

Species of bird

The brown-capped pygmy woodpecker or Indian pygmy woodpecker (Yungipicus nanus) is a species of very small woodpecker found in Nepal, India and Sri Lanka. Some taxonomic authorities continue to place this species in the genus Dendrocopos or Picoides. This species is non-migratory and often spotted in pairs or small family groups. They are known for being very active and are not often spotted, despite their constant foraging in the tree canopy.

== Description ==
The brown-capped pygmy woodpecker has brownish cap from the forehead to hindneck. A small brown and white woodpecker with distinctive pink-rimmed white irises. Barred brown and white above, lightly streaked dirty white below. Tail spotted white. Paler brown crown (edged red in male) and eyestripes contrasting with white supercilia and cheeks.

== Distribution and habitat ==
This is a non-migratory bird found across most of India (except the northeast/Thar desert), Nepal, and Sri Lanka. It inhabits diverse, habitats up to 2300m, including deciduous/secondary forests, orchards, and also urban gardens. They are resident, though birds at higher altitudes may move to lower elevations during the winter months.

== Behaviour and ecology ==
These are highly active birds that often forage in pairs or mixed-species flocks in the canopy. They feed on small invertebrates by gleaning and probing wood; also nectar, and fruit, and are a territorial species that nests in tree cavities. They are monogamous and territorial. The call is a weak, rapid, rattling sound on a rising scale, lasting 1.2 to 1.5 seconds. Prefers tropical/subtropical dry, moist, and deciduous forests, as well as mangroves and cultivated areas. Breeding season is from February to May. Excavate nesting holes 2–14 meters high in dead branches, with a 3 cm entrance diameter. Both sexes are involved in excavating and feeding.

== Gallery ==
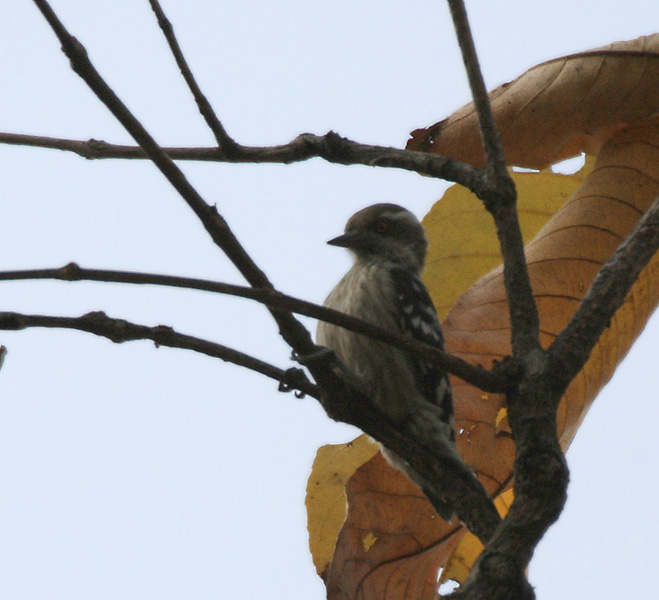
Brown-capped pygmy woodpecker in Kawal Wildlife Sanctuary, India.

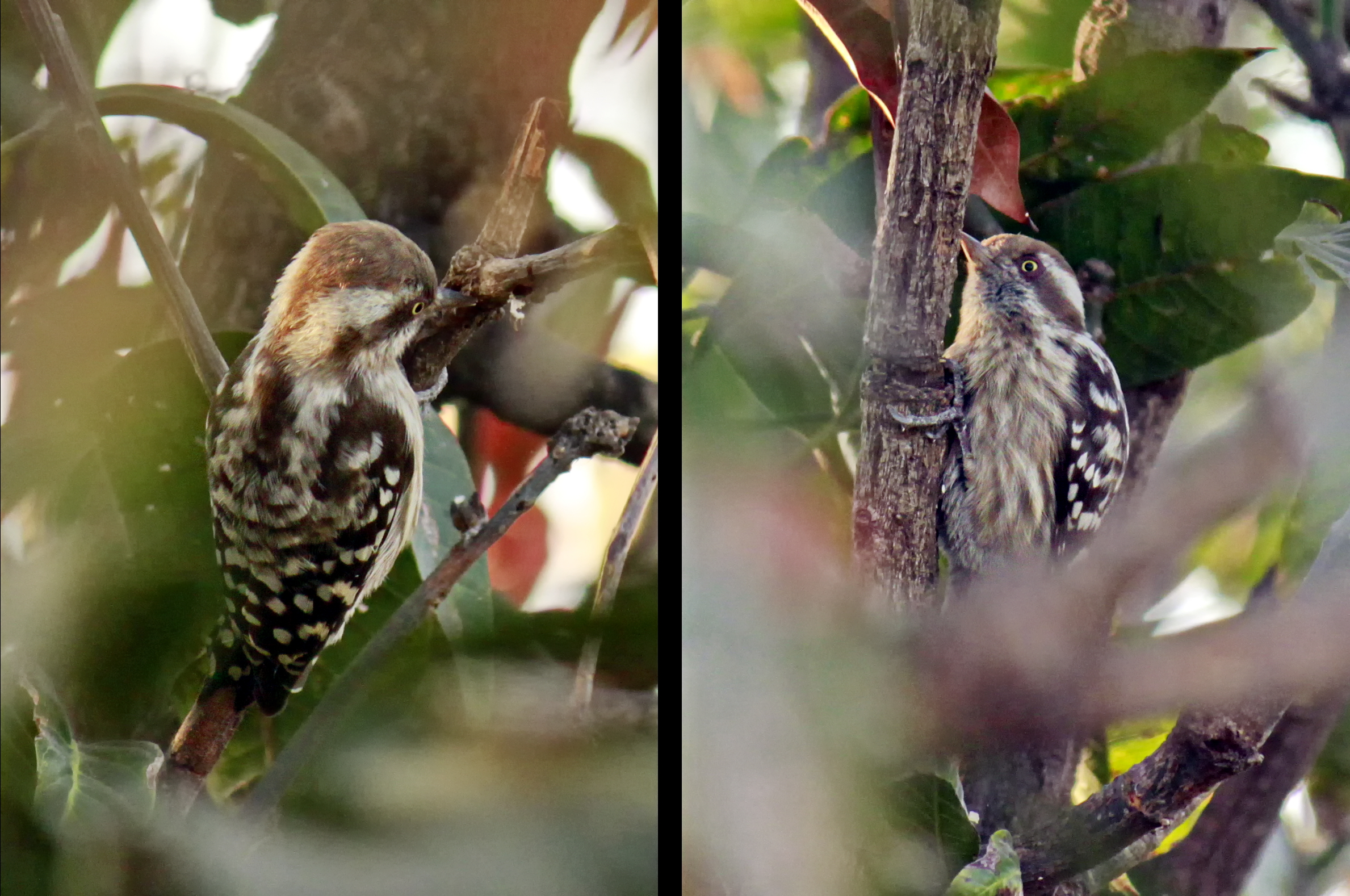
Brown-capped pygmy woodpecker in Haldwani, Uttarakhand, India

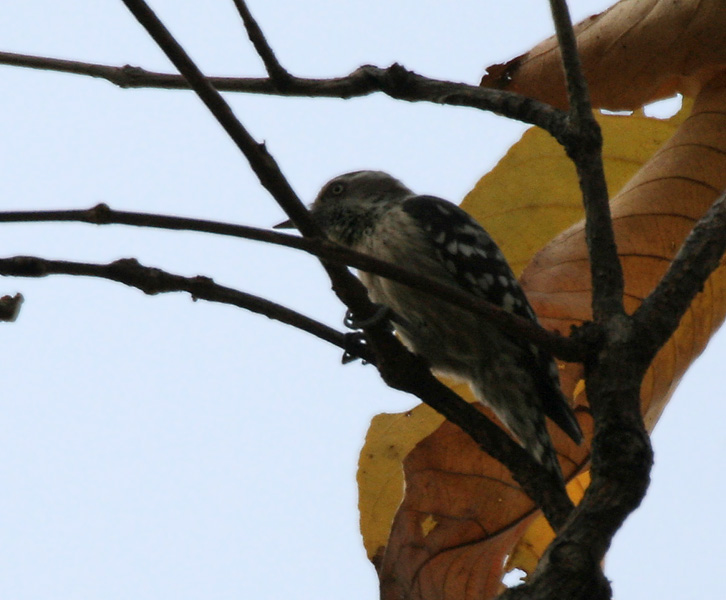
in Kawal WS

Media related to Yungipicus nanus at Wikimedia Commons
