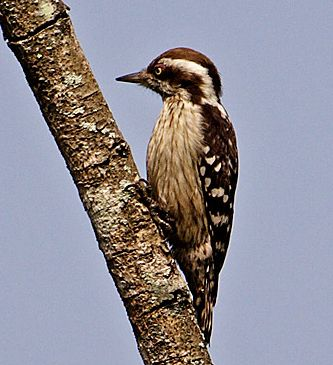
- Brown-capped pygmy woodpecker Yungipicus nanus

Scientific classification
- Kingdom: Animalia
- Phylum: Chordata
- Class: Aves
- Order: Piciformes
- Family: Picidae
- Tribe: Melanerpini
- Genus: Yungipicus; Bonaparte, 1854

Species
- 7, see text

= Yungipicus =

Genus of birds

Yungipicus is a genus of woodpeckers in the family Picidae native to Asia. The species in this genus were previously placed in the genus Dendrocopos.

== Taxonomy ==
A molecular phylogenetic analysis of the pied woodpeckers published in 2015 found that the genus Dendrocopos was polyphyletic. In the subsequent rearrangement to create monophyletic genera, seven species were moved to the resurrected genus Yungipicus. The genus had been introduced by the French ornithologist Charles Lucien Bonaparte in 1854. The name combines the Ancient Greek iunx meaning wryneck which was used by Carl Linnaeus for his genus Jynx, with the Latin picus meaning "woodpecker". The type species was designated by the English zoologist George Robert Gray in 1855 as a subspecies of the brown-capped pygmy woodpecker, Yungipicus nanus hardwickii. The genus is in the tribe Melanerpini, one of five tribes that make up the woodpecker subfamily Picinae. The genus Yungipicus is sister to the genus Picoides.

The genus includes seven species:

Image	Common name	Scientific name	Distribution
	Sulawesi pygmy woodpecker	Yungipicus temminckii	Sulawesi in Indonesia
	Brown-capped pygmy woodpecker	Yungipicus nanus	Nepal, India and Sri Lanka.
	Grey-capped pygmy woodpecker	Yungipicus canicapillus	Northeast India, Manchuria, eastern Siberia, and Korea.
	Philippine pygmy woodpecker	Yungipicus maculatus	Philippines.
	Sulu pygmy woodpecker	Yungipicus ramsayi	Philippines.
	Sunda pygmy woodpecker	Yungipicus moluccensis	Brunei, Indonesia, Malaysia, and Singapore.
	Japanese pygmy woodpecker	Yungipicus kizuki	Russia, China, Korea and Japan.
