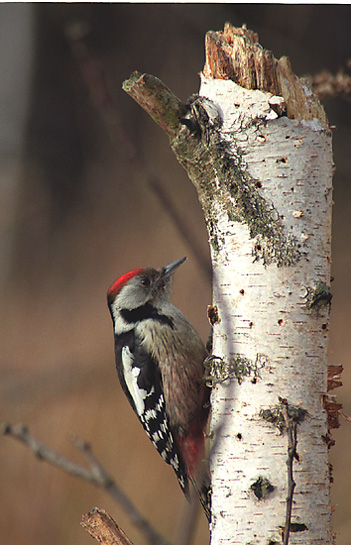
- Middle spotted woodpecker Dendrocoptes medius

Scientific classification
- Kingdom: Animalia
- Phylum: Chordata
- Class: Aves
- Order: Piciformes
- Family: Picidae
- Tribe: Melanerpini
- Genus: Dendrocoptes; Cabanis & Heine, 1863

Species
- 3, see text

= Dendrocoptes =

Genus of birds

Dendrocoptes is a genus of woodpeckers in the family Picidae native to Eurasia.

== Taxonomy ==
The genus Dendrocoptes was erected by the German ornithologists Jean Cabanis and Ferdinand Heine in 1863 with the middle spotted woodpecker (Dendrocoptes medius ) as the type species. The name combines the Ancient Greek dendron meaning "tree" and koptō meaning "to strike". A 2015 molecular phylogenetic analysis of the nuclear and mitochondrial DNA sequences from pied woodpeckers found that the genus Dendrocopos was polyphyletic. As part of the reorganisation to create monophyletic genera, three species from Dendrocopos were moved to the resurrected genus Dendrocoptes. The taxonomic committee of the British Ornithologists' Union recommended an alternative arrangement in which the genera Dendrocoptes and Leiopicus were combined into a larger Dendropicos. The yellow-crowned woodpecker (Leiopicus mahrattensis) is closely related to the species in this genus.

The genus contains three species:

Image	Scientific name	Common Name	Distribution
	Dendrocoptes dorae	Arabian woodpecker	southwestern Saudi Arabia and Yemen
	Dendrocoptes auriceps	Brown-fronted woodpecker	Afghanistan, India, Nepal, Pakistan and Bhutan.
	Dendrocoptes medius	Middle spotted woodpecker	northern Spain and France east to Poland and Ukraine, and south to central Italy (where local), the Balkan Peninsula, Lithuania, Latvia, Turkey, the Caucasus, and Iran
