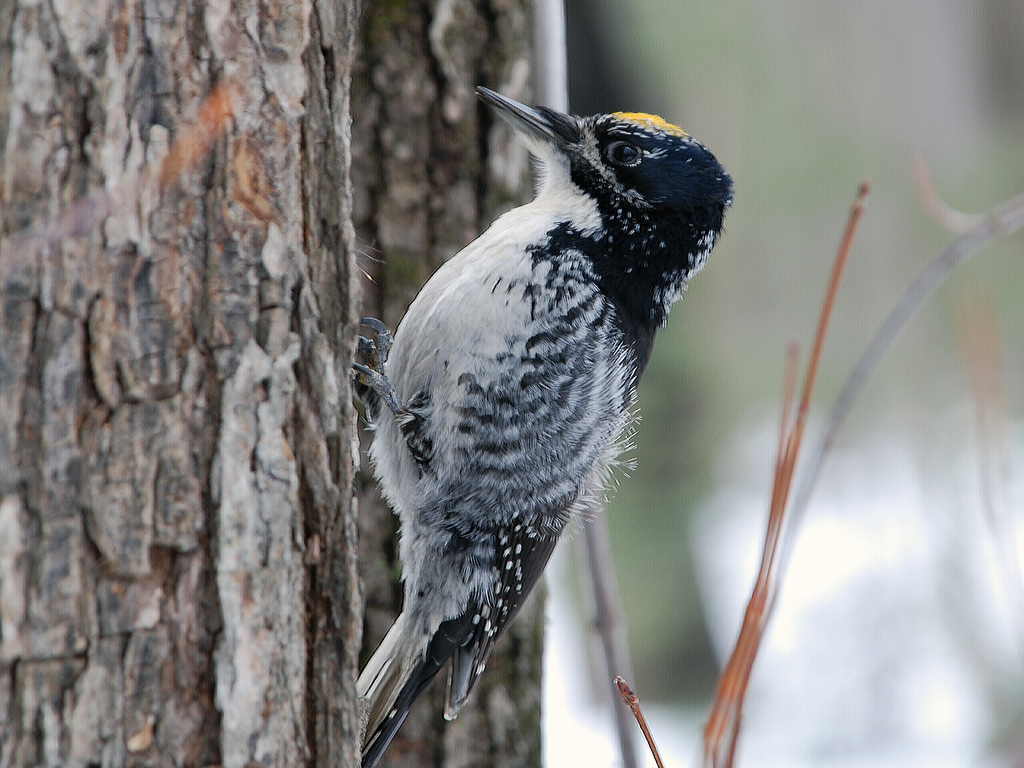
- Adult male
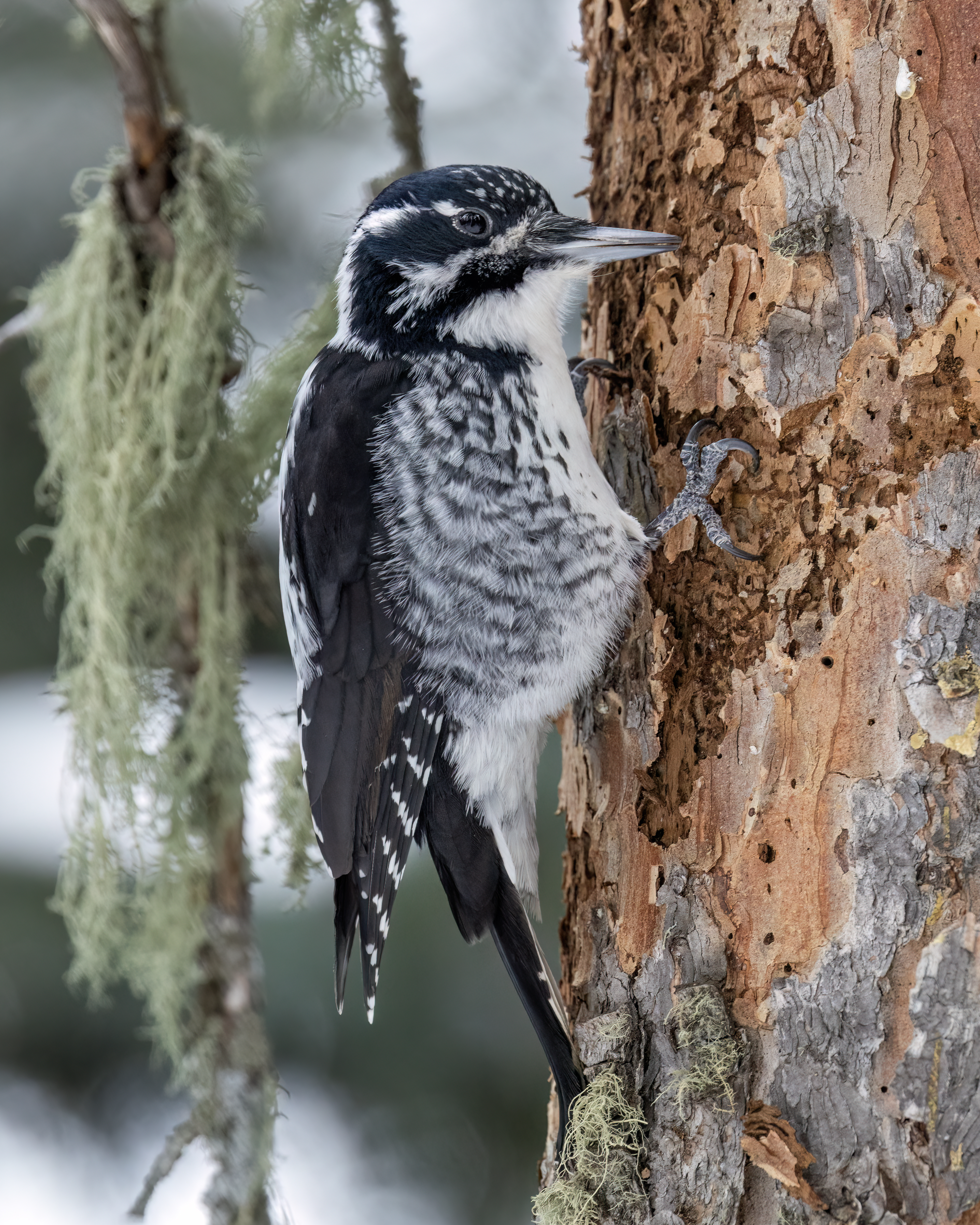
- Adult female

Conservation status
- Least Concern (IUCN 3.1) (Note: IUCN (the source of status and spatial data of ranges in these maps) does not recognize P. (tridactylus) dorsalis as separate species.)

Scientific classification
- Kingdom: Animalia
- Phylum: Chordata
- Class: Aves
- Order: Piciformes
- Family: Picidae
- Genus: Picoides
- Species: P. dorsalis

Binomial name
- Picoides dorsalis Baird, 1858
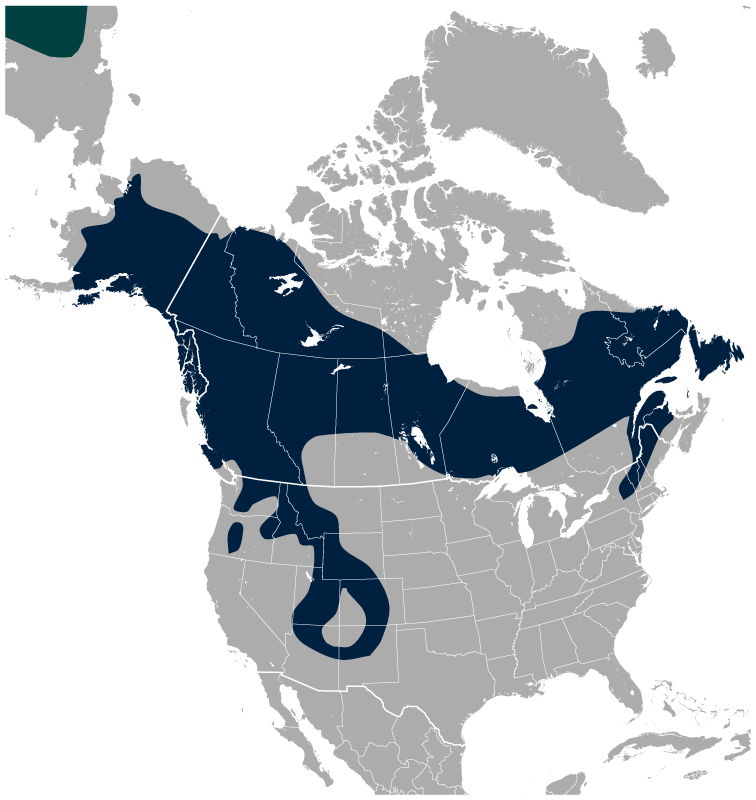
- American three-toed woodpecker range. A small portion of the Eurasian three-toed woodpecker P. tridactylus range is visible too.
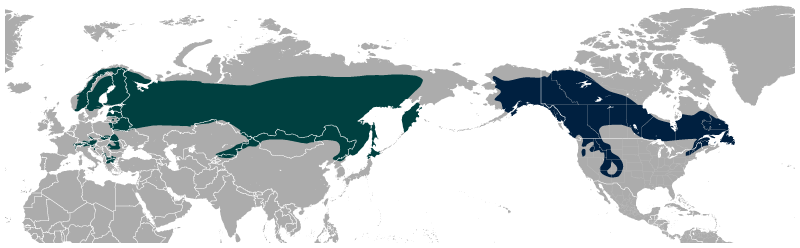
- Eurasian and American three-toed woodpeckers ranges.

= American three-toed woodpecker =

Species of bird

The American three-toed woodpecker (Picoides dorsalis) is a medium-sized woodpecker (family Picidae), which is native to North America.

== Description ==
This woodpecker has a length between 21 – 23 cm (8.3 – 9.1 in) and a wingspan between 37 – 39 cm (14.6 – 15.3 in). Males have an average weight of 58.3 g (2.06 oz), and females are slightly smaller, averaging 52 g (1.8 oz). Its maximum lifespan in the wild is 6 years. It closely resembles the black-backed woodpecker, which is also three-toed. Until recently, it was considered to be the same species as the Eurasian three-toed woodpecker, P. tridactylus. Adults are black on the head, wings and rump, and white from the throat to the belly; the flanks are white with black bars. The back is white with black bars and the tail is black with the white outer feathers barred with black. The adult male has a yellow cap.

== Breeding ==
The breeding habitat is coniferous forests across western Canada, Alaska and the western and extreme northeastern United States. It has also been seen in Michigan's upper peninsula, and has been recorded breeding in the extreme north of Wisconsin and Minnesota on extremely rare occasions. The female lays 3 to 7 but most often 4 eggs in a nest cavity in a dead conifer or sometimes a live tree or pole. The pair excavates a new nest each year. American three-toed woodpeckers rely on disturbed, old-growth forests and are strongly associated with active spruce beetle infestations, with beetle-infested trees being important for the woodpeckers and other species that depend on the cavities they excavate.

== Movements and foraging ==
This bird is normally a permanent resident, but northern birds may move south and birds at high elevations may move to lower levels in winter. American three-toed woodpeckers forage on conifers in search of wood-boring beetle larvae or other insects. They may also eat fruit and tree sap. These birds often move into areas with large numbers of insect-infested trees, often following a forest fire or flooding. This bird is likely to give way to the black-backed woodpecker where the two species compete for habitat.

== Subspecies ==
- Picoides dorsalis dorsalis, Native to the Rocky Mountains from Montana to Nevada, Arizona and New Mexico.
- Picoides dorsalis fasciatus, Native to Alaska and Northwestern Canada. Can be found as far south as Oregon, Idaho, and Montana.
- Picoides dorsalis bacatus, Native to the Great Lakes Region, eastern Canada, and the northeastern United States.
