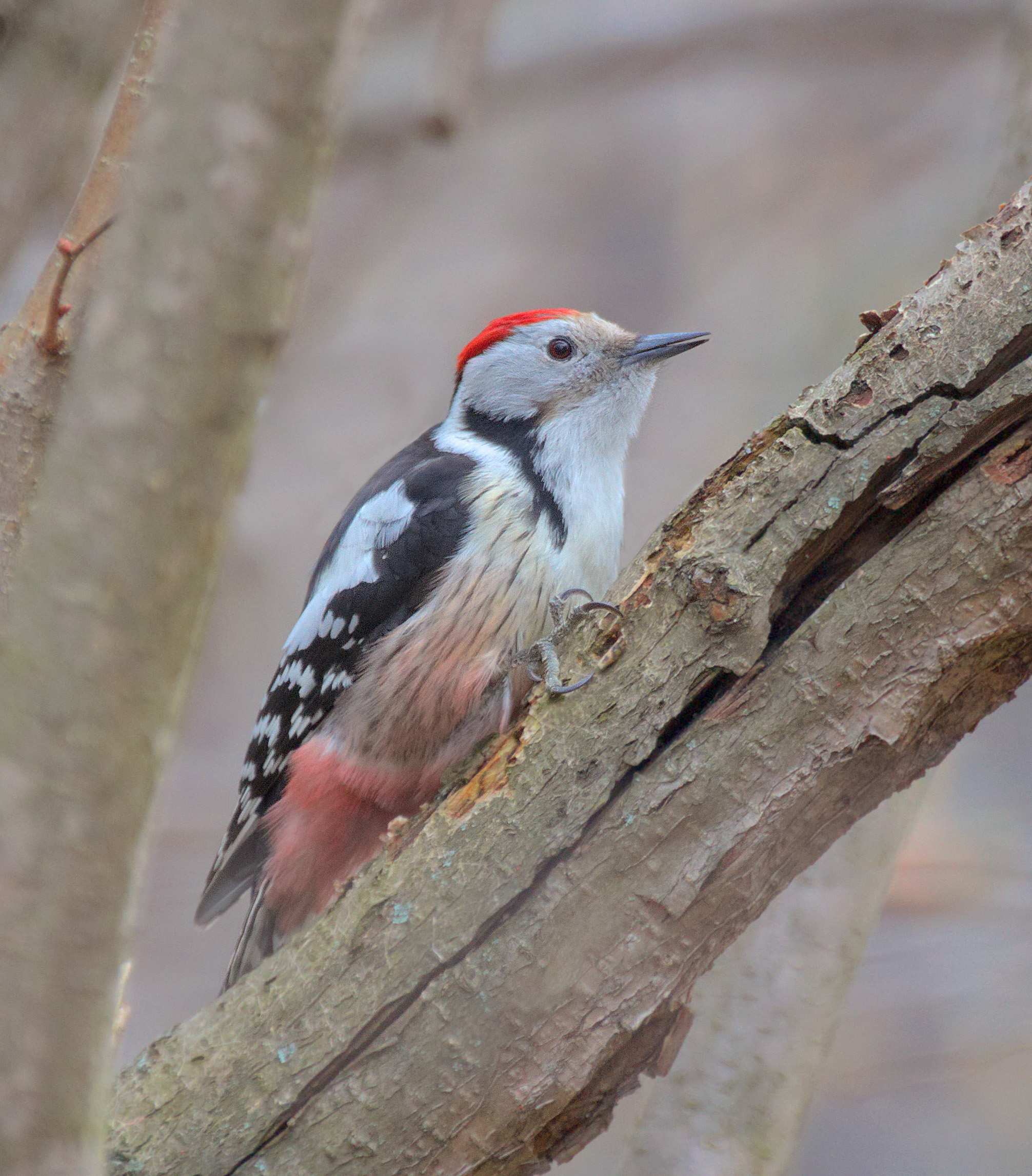

Conservation status
- Least Concern (IUCN 3.1)

Scientific classification
- Kingdom: Animalia
- Phylum: Chordata
- Class: Aves
- Order: Piciformes
- Family: Picidae
- Genus: Dendrocoptes
- Species: D. medius

Binomial name
- Dendrocoptes medius (Linnaeus, 1758)
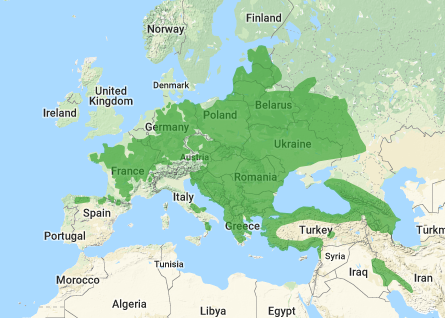
- Range of D. medius

Synonyms
- Picus medius Linnaeus, 1758; Leiopicus medius (Linnaeus, 1758); Dendrocopos medius (Linnaeus, 1758)

Audio

= Middle spotted woodpecker =

Species of bird

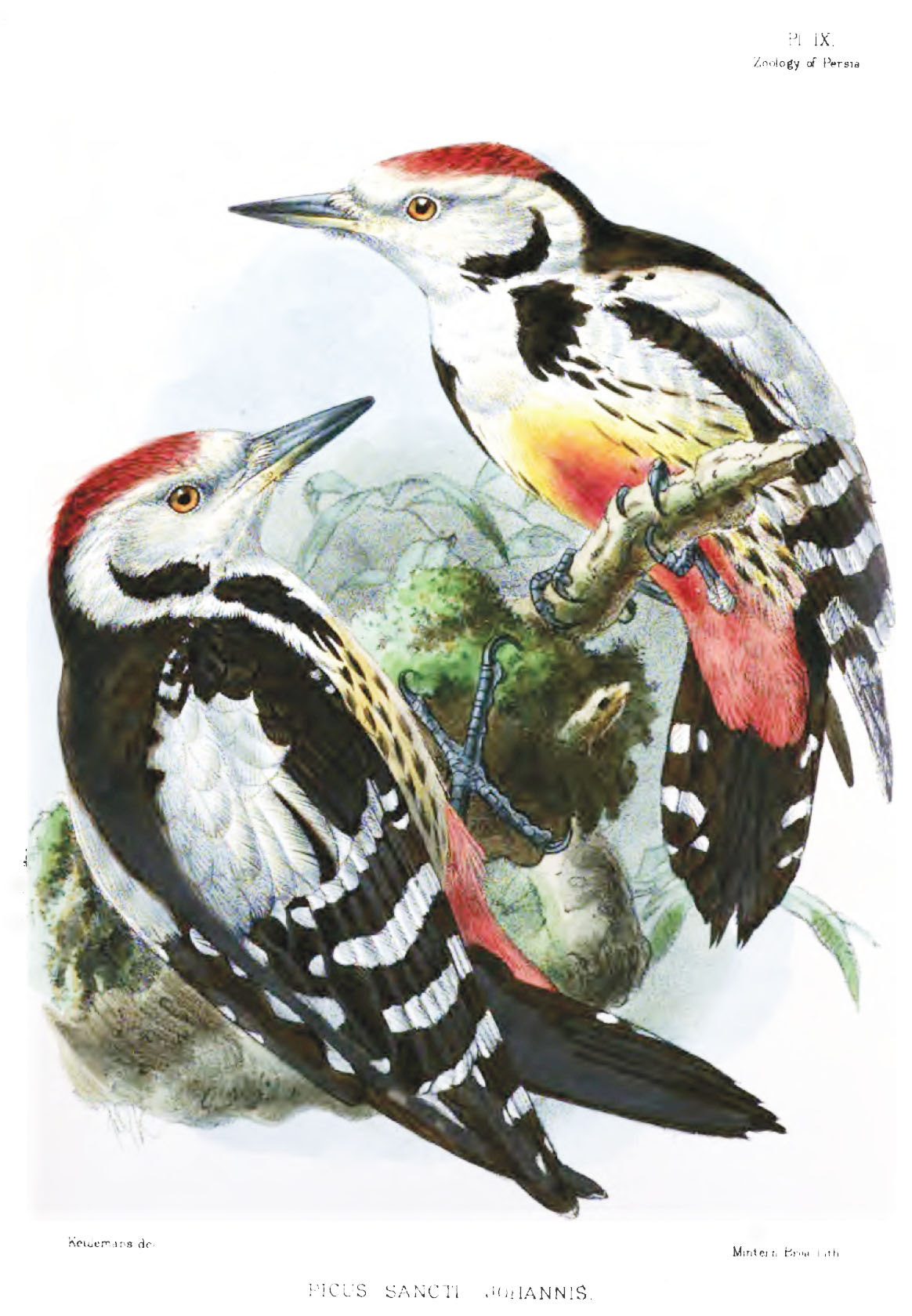
Race sanctijohannis from the Zagros region

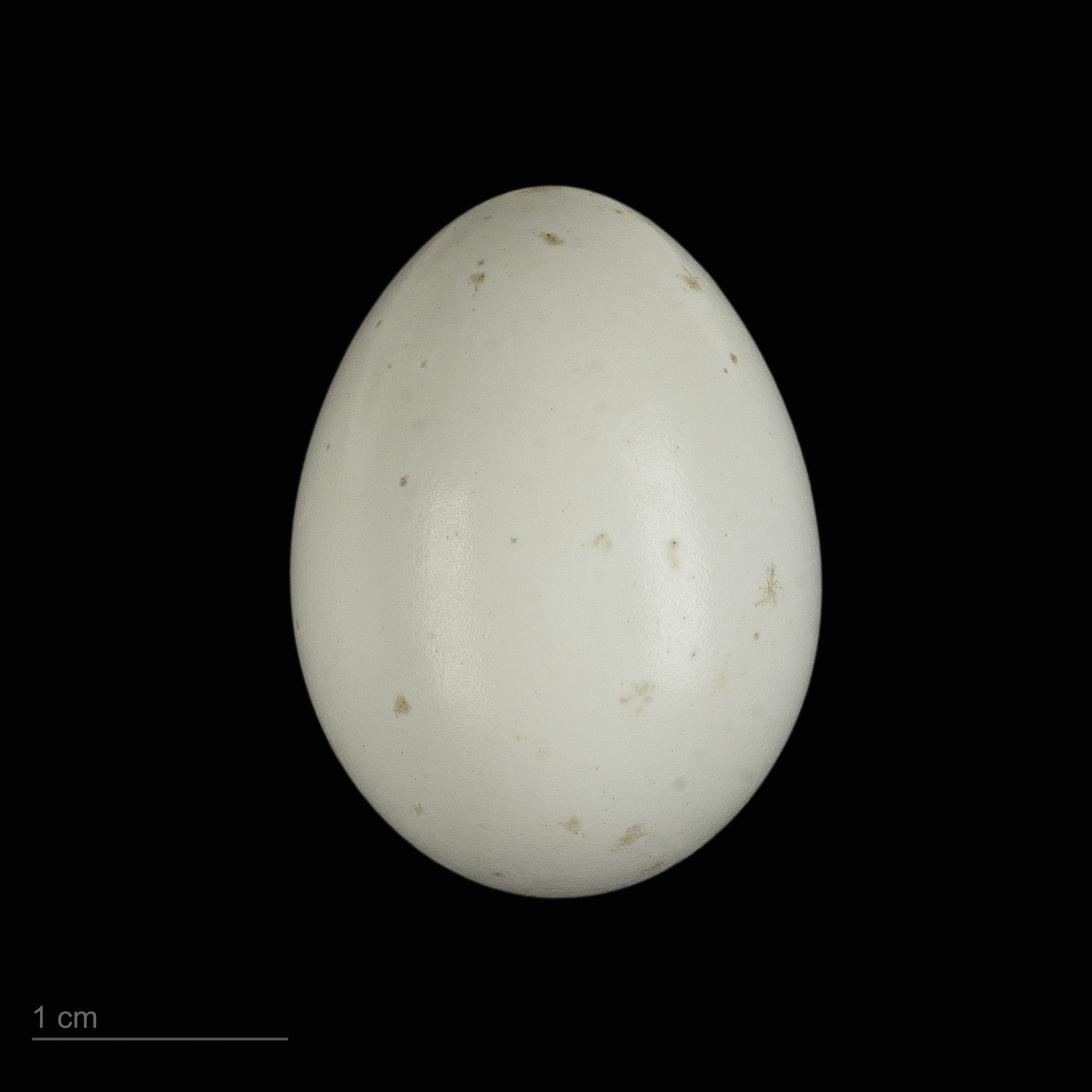
Dendrocopos medius

The middle spotted woodpecker (Dendrocoptes medius) is a mainly European woodpecker belonging to the genus Dendrocoptes.

== Taxonomy ==
The middle spotted woodpecker was formally described by the Swedish naturalist Carl Linnaeus in 1758 in the tenth edition of his Systema Naturae under the binomial name Picus medius. The specific epithet is Latin for "intermediate". Linnaeus gave the locality as Europe, but this is now taken to be Sweden. For many years this woodpecker was usually placed in the genus Dendrocopos but a 2015 molecular phylogenetic study that compared nuclear and mitochondrial DNA sequences from pied woodpeckers found that Dendrocopos was polyphyletic. As part of the reorganisation to create monophyletic genera, the middle spotted woodpecker was one of three species that were placed in the resurrected genus Dendrocoptes. This genus had been described by the German ornithologists Jean Cabanis and Ferdinand Heine in 1863 with the middle spotted woodpecker as the type species.

Four subspecies are recognised:

- Dendrocoptes medius medius (Linnaeus, 1758) – Europe to west Russia
- Dendrocoptes medius caucasicus Bianchi, 1905 – north Turkey through the Caucasus
- Dendrocoptes medius anatoliae (Hartert, 1912) – west and south Turkey
- Dendrocoptes medius sanctijohannis (Blanford, 1873) – Zagros Mountains (southwest Iran)

== Description ==
The middle spotted woodpecker is 20–22 cm long and has plumage similar to the great spotted woodpecker. As with that species the upperparts are predominantly black with white oval wing patches and white barring on the wings, and the underparts are white. The main differences are a red crown, lack of a black moustachial stripe, a pink vent, and dark streaks on the flanks. Although only slightly smaller than the great spotted woodpecker, it appears smaller due to its short, slender bill and more rounded, pale head. It can also be confused with the Syrian woodpecker (particularly juveniles), being distinguished from this by the smaller bill, the red crown not having narrow black sides, and the moustachial stripe not reaching the bill.

== Distribution and habitat ==
The middle spotted woodpecker occurs only in Europe and parts of West Asia in the Palearctic, from northern Spain and France east to Poland and Ukraine, and south to central Italy (where local), the Balkan Peninsula, Lithuania, Latvia, Turkey, the Caucasus, and Iran. The species is common in Estonia, but virtually nonexistent in Finland. This species used to breed in Sweden but became extinct in the 1980s. However, middle spotted woodpeckers have been seen again in Sweden in their breeding habitat in recent years, suggesting a recolonisation of the country. Due to its sedentary nature it has never been recorded in the British Isles. It prefers deciduous forest regions, especially areas with old oak, hornbeam and elm, and a patchwork of clearings, pasture and dense woodland.

== Behaviour and ecology ==
Behaviourally it likes to feed high in the trees, moving constantly and making a good view difficult. In the breeding season it excavates a nest hole about 5 cm wide in a decaying tree trunk or thick branch. It lays four to seven eggs and incubates for 11–14 days.

The middle spotted woodpecker lives predominantly on a diet of insects as well as their larvae, which it finds by picking them from branches and twigs rather than hacking them from beneath the bark. It will also feed on tree sap. It is rarely heard drumming, and never for territorial purposes, which it asserts by song; a slow, nasal gvayk gvayk gvayk gvayk gvayk. Calls include a fast kik kekekekek.
