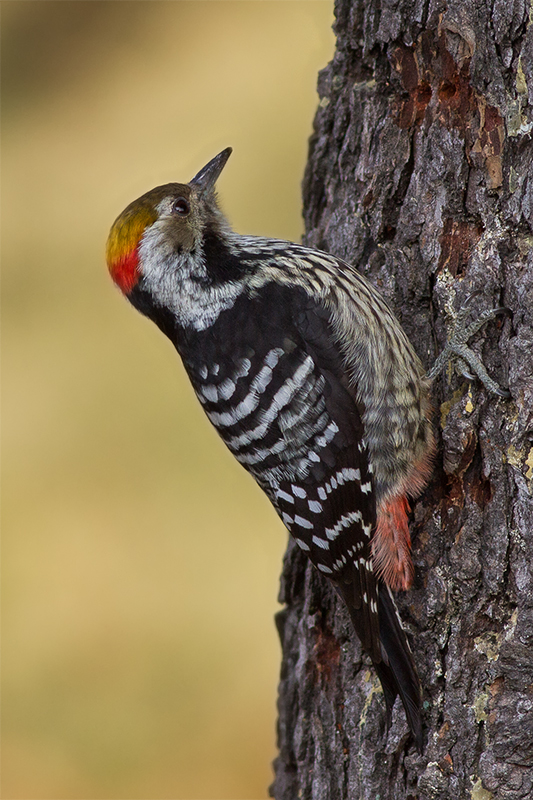
- Male in Uttarakhand, India
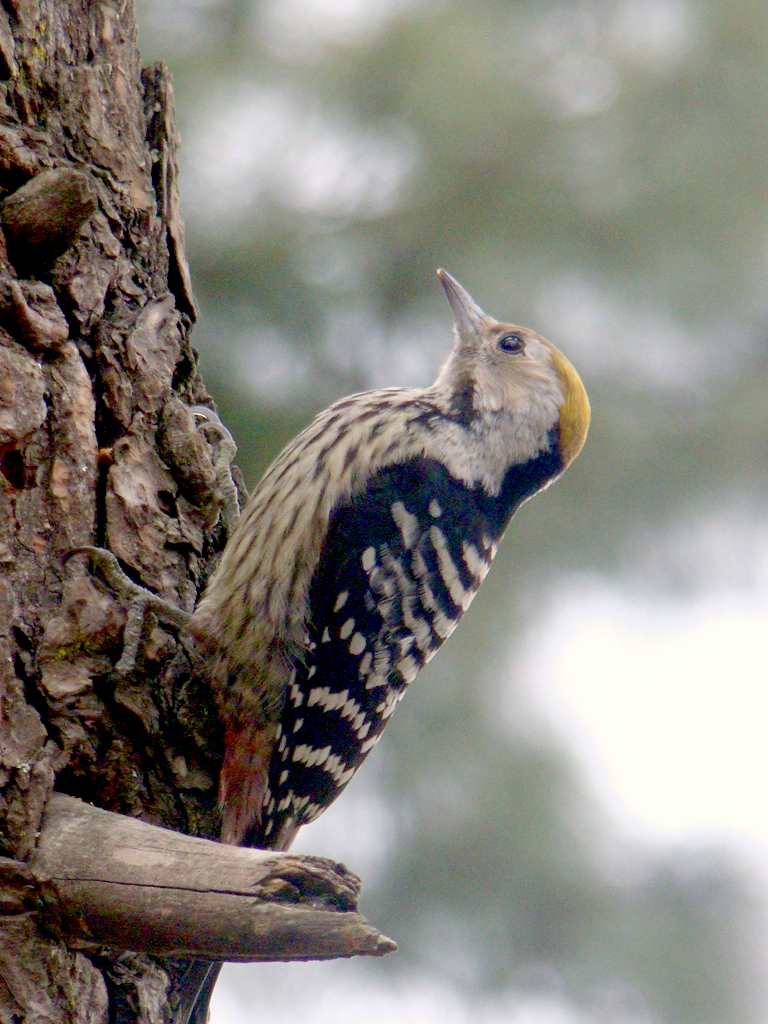
- Female

Conservation status
- Least Concern (IUCN 3.1)

Scientific classification
- Kingdom: Animalia
- Phylum: Chordata
- Class: Aves
- Order: Piciformes
- Family: Picidae
- Genus: Dendrocoptes
- Species: D. auriceps

Binomial name
- Dendrocoptes auriceps (Vigors, 1831)

Synonyms
- Leiopicus auriceps Dendrocopos auriceps

= Brown-fronted woodpecker =

Species of bird

The brown-fronted woodpecker (Dendrocoptes auriceps) is a species of bird in the family Picidae. It ranges across the northern regions of the Indian subcontinent, primarily the lower-to-middle altitudes of the Himalayas. It is found in Afghanistan, India, Nepal, Pakistan and Bhutan.

Some taxonomic authorities continue to place the species in Dendrocopos, while others place it genus Leiopicus.

== Habitat ==
Its natural habitats are temperate forests and subtropical or tropical moist montane forests.

== Description ==
A medium-sized, pied woodpecker with yellow in crown. White-barred (rather than spotted) black. Underparts, prominent black moustache extending to breast and black-streaked white underparts. Vent deep pink. In male forecrown brown, centre yellow, rear red with black rear neck. In female whole crown yellow.
