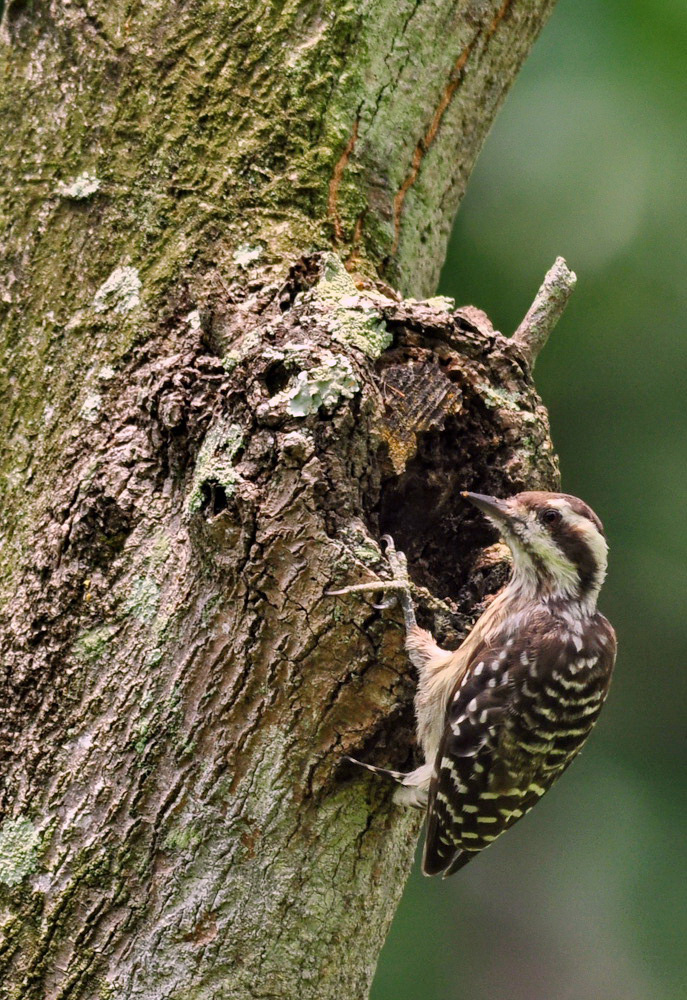

Conservation status
- Least Concern (IUCN 3.1)

Scientific classification
- Kingdom: Animalia
- Phylum: Chordata
- Class: Aves
- Order: Piciformes
- Family: Picidae
- Genus: Yungipicus
- Species: Y. moluccensis

Binomial name
- Yungipicus moluccensis (Gmelin, JF, 1788)

Synonyms
- Picoides moluccensis Dendrocopos moluccensis

= Sunda pygmy woodpecker =

Species of bird

The Sunda pygmy woodpecker (Yungipicus moluccensis), also known as the Sunda woodpecker, is a species of bird in the family Picidae. It is found in Brunei, Indonesia, Malaysia, and Singapore. Some taxonomic authorities continue to place this species in the genus Dendrocopos or Picoides.

== Taxonomy ==
The Sunda pygmy woodpecker was formally described in 1788 by the German naturalist Johann Friedrich Gmelin in his revised and expanded edition of Carl Linnaeus's Systema Naturae. He placed it with the other woodpeckers in the genus Picus and coined the binomial name Picus moluccensis. Gmelin based his description on "Le petit épeiche brun des Moluques" that had been described in 1780 by the French polymath Comte de Buffon in his Histoire Naturelle des Oiseaux. The locality was originally specified as the Maluku Islands. This was an error and has been corrected to the state of Malacca in Malaysia. The Sunda pygmy woodpecker is now one of seven species placed in the genus Yungipicus that was introduced in 1854 by Charles Lucien Bonaparte.

Two subspecies are recognised:

- Y. m. moluccensis (Gmelin, JF, 1788) – Malay Peninsula to Borneo, Sumatra, Riau Islands (east of central Sumatra), Bangka and Belitung (east of south Sumatra), Java and Bali
- Y. m. grandis Hargitt, 1882 – Lombok to Alor Island (west, central Lesser Sunda Islands)

== Description ==
This is a small woodpecker with an overall length of around 13 cm (5.1 in). It has a greyish brown capped head, dark brown ear covers with two rather broad whitish grey bands narrowing towards neck. Upper parts greyish brown with white wings tipped with white thus appearing striped. Tail short and blackish with white bands. Lores and throat white leading into dirty white underparts. Upper breast streaked with brown reducing towards vent. Whitish underwing coverts with pale brown. Sexes dimorphic. Males have a reddish orange crown which is absent in females.

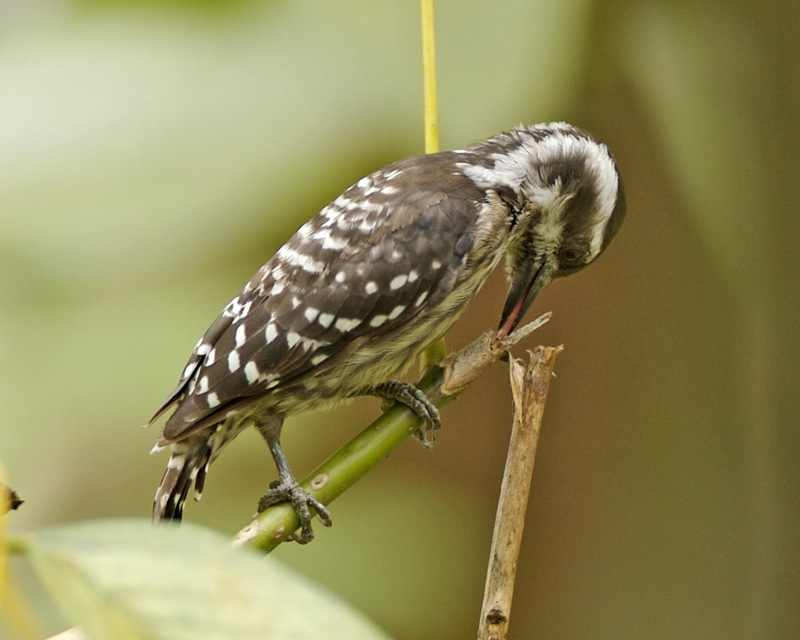
Adult Sunda woodpecker

== Distribution and habitat ==
Its natural habitats are subtropical or tropical moist lowland forest, subtropical or tropical mangrove forest, and subtropical or tropical moist montane forest.

== Behaviour and ecology ==
A common visitor to urban areas and forests in Singapore. Often found singly or in pairs rapidly moving up trees. Found from ground right up into the topmost branches of trees on dead branches.

Singapore, Oct 1994
