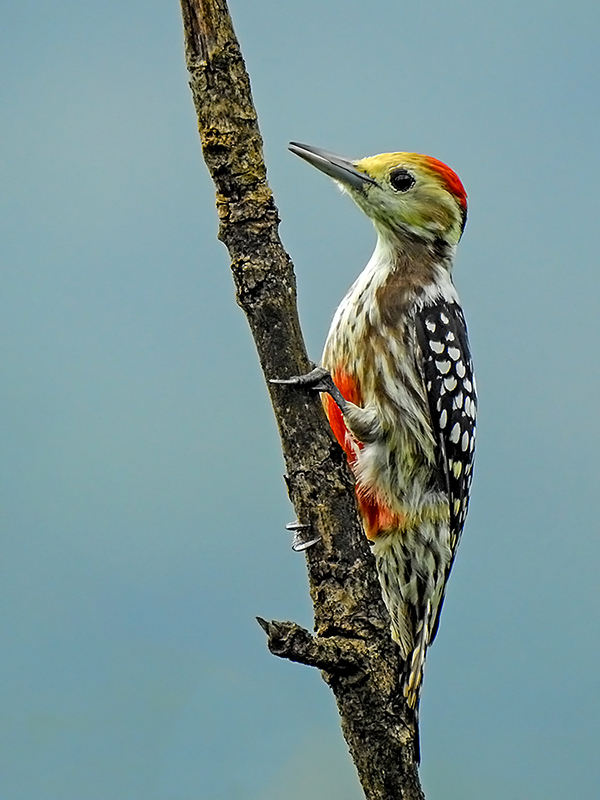
- Male yellow-crowned woodpecker in Mangaon

Conservation status
- Least Concern (IUCN 3.1)

Scientific classification
- Kingdom: Animalia
- Phylum: Chordata
- Class: Aves
- Order: Piciformes
- Family: Picidae
- Genus: Leiopicus; Bonaparte, 1854
- Species: L. mahrattensis

Binomial name
- Leiopicus mahrattensis (Latham, 1801)
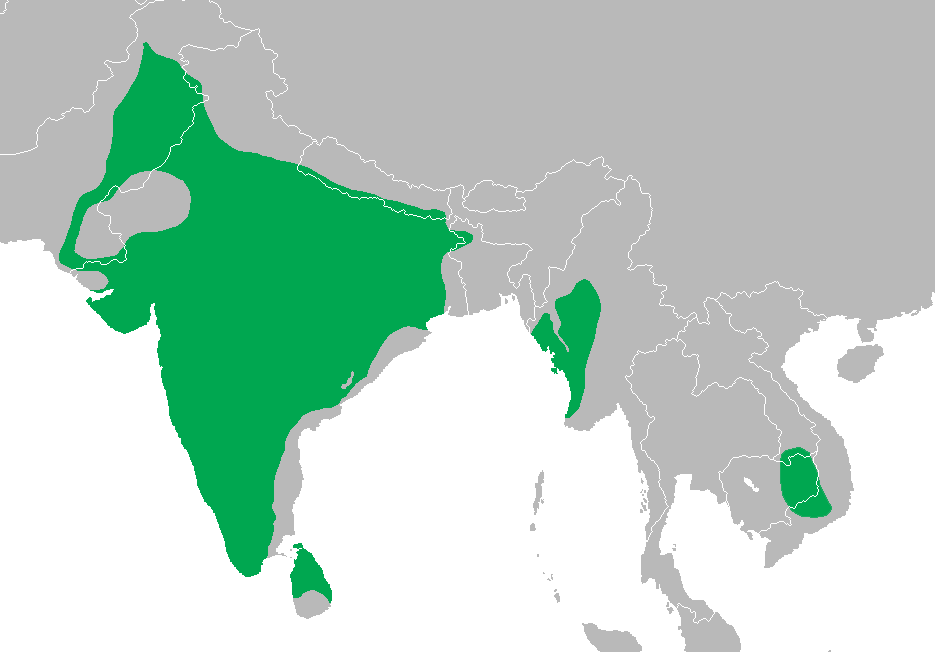

Synonyms
- Dendrocopos mahrattensis

= Yellow-crowned woodpecker =

Species of bird

The yellow-crowned woodpecker (Leiopicus mahrattensis) or Mahratta woodpecker is a species of small pied woodpecker found in the Indian subcontinent. It is the only species placed in the genus Leiopicus.

== Taxonomy ==
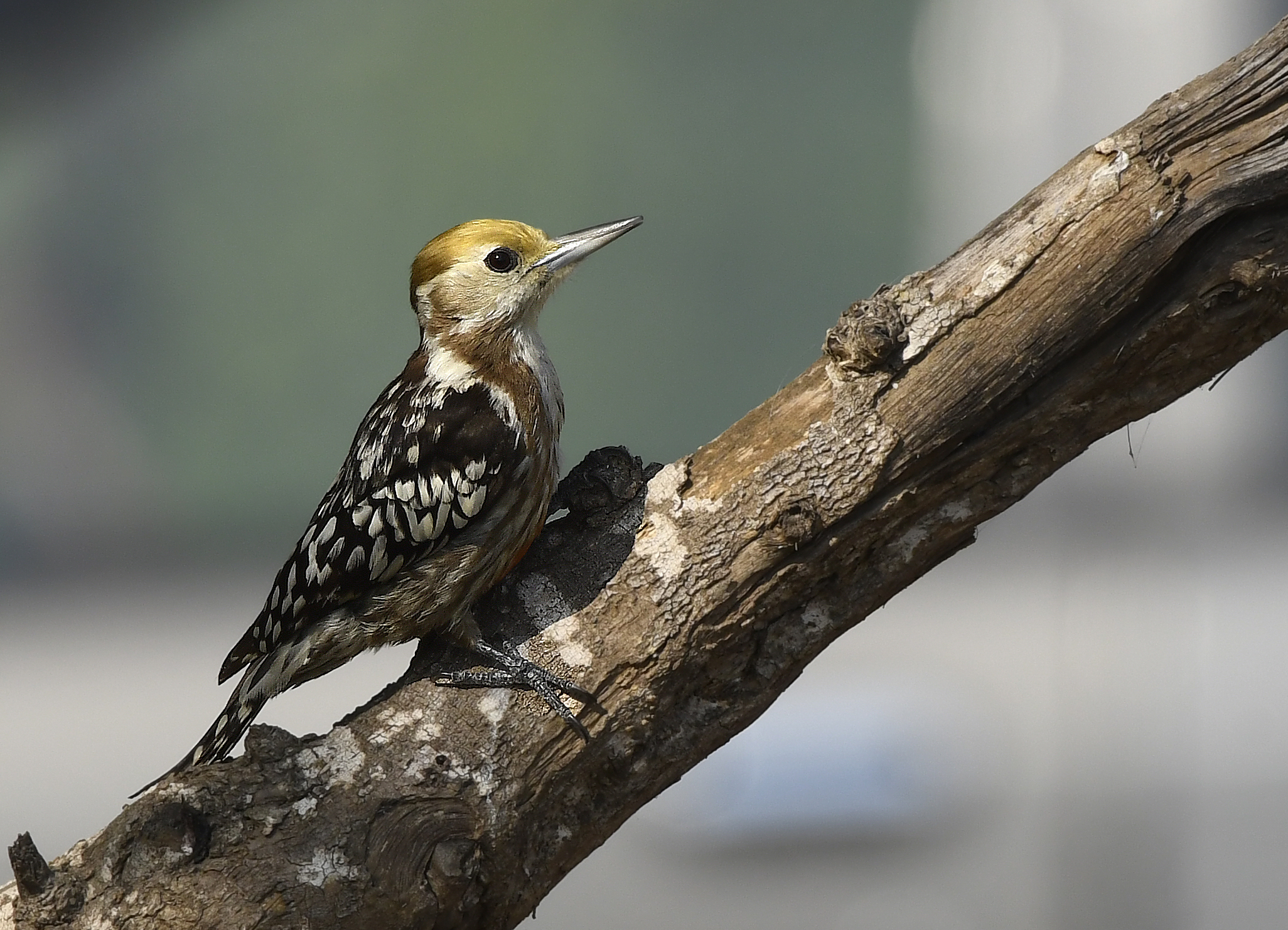
Female at Khijadiya Bird Sanctuary

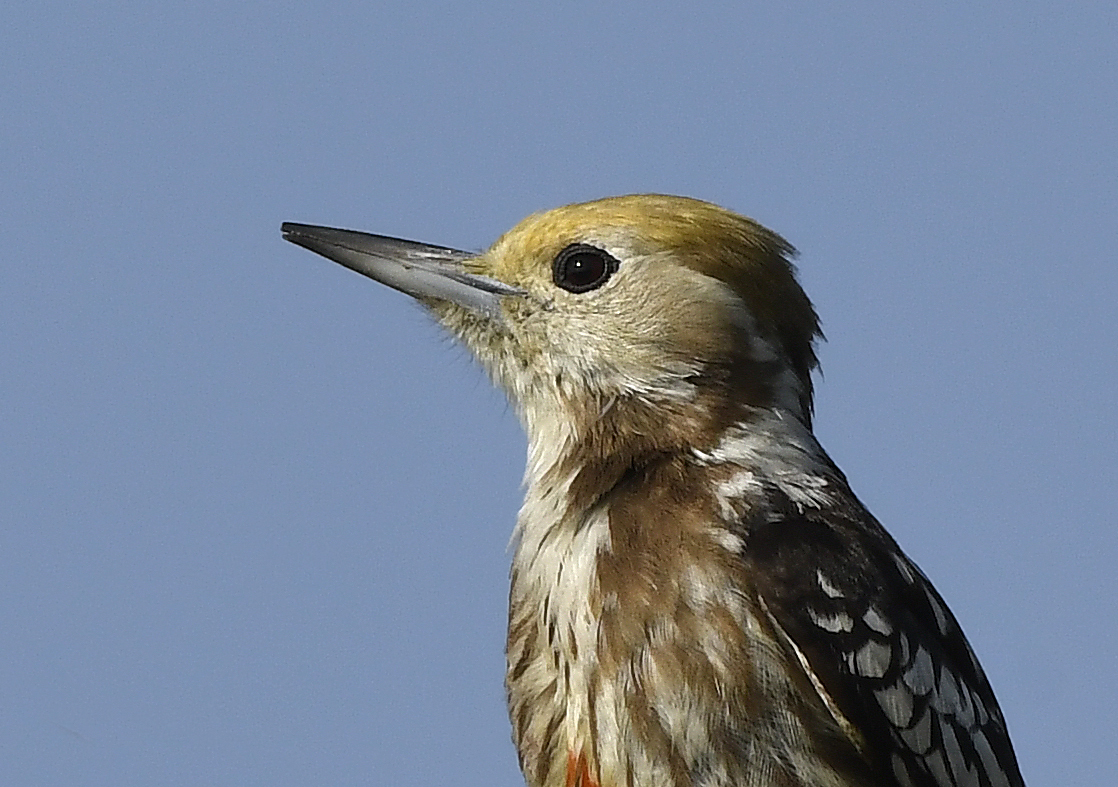
Female at Khijadiya Bird Sanctuary

The yellow-crowned woodpecker was originally described by the English ornithologist John Latham in 1801 under the binomial name Picus mahrattensis. It is now the only species placed in the genus Leiopicus that was introduced by the French ornithologist Charles Lucien Bonaparte in 1854. The specific epithet mahrattensis is from Marhatta, a historical region in the modern Indian state of Maharashtra. The genus name Leiopicus combines the Classical Greek leios meaning "smooth" or "beardless" and pikos meaning "woodpecker". The yellow-crowned woodpecker is closely related to the woodpeckers in the genus Dendrocoptes.

== Description ==
A medium-small (17.5 cm, 6.9 inches, 28-46 grams, 1–1.6 ounces), pale-headed, pied woodpecker. Upper-parts black, heavily spotted and barred white. Underparts dark, streaked dingy white with red belly patch. Irregular brown cheek and neck patches. Female has yellowish crown and nape. In male nape scarlet and fore-crown yellow.
