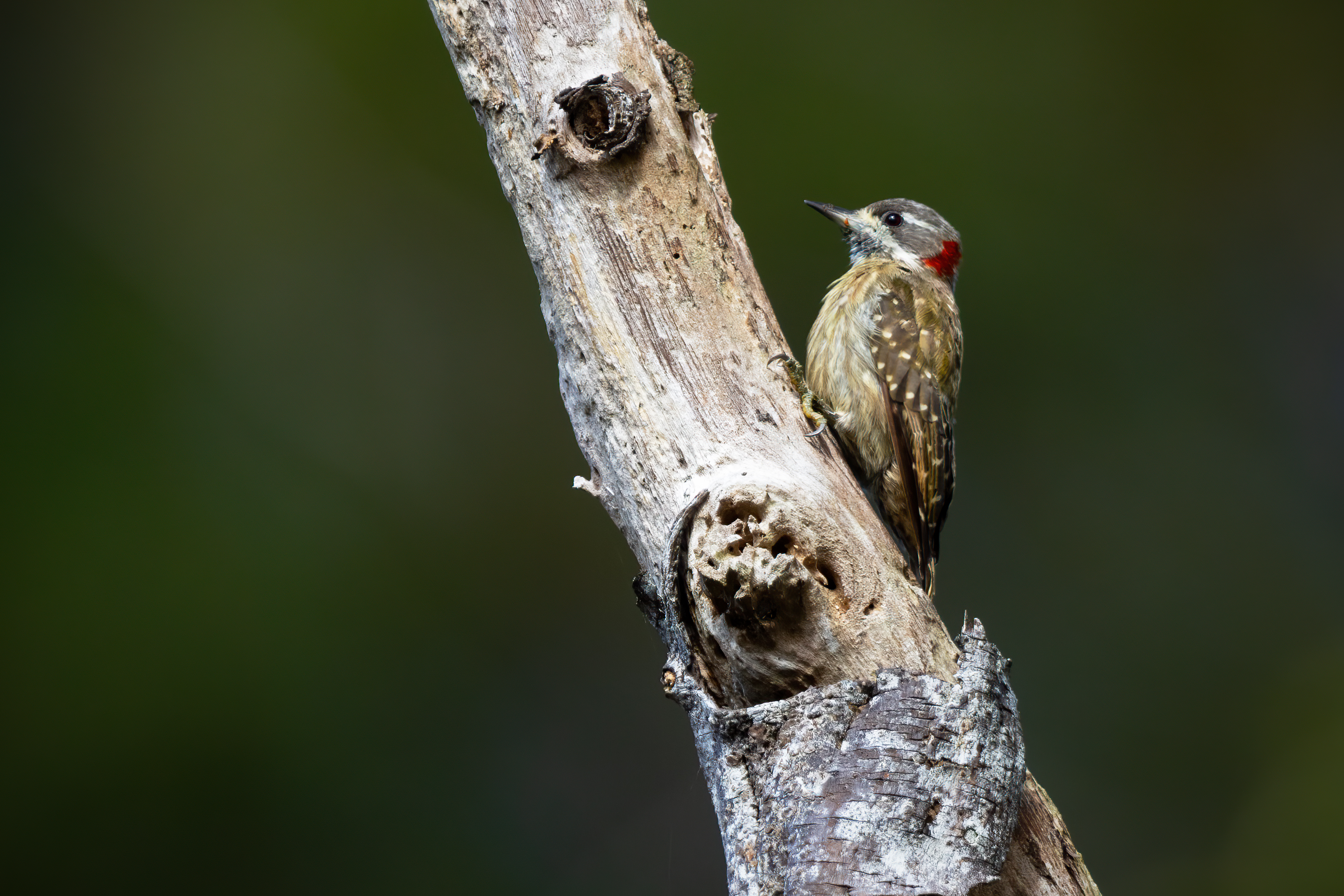

Conservation status
- Least Concern (IUCN 3.1)

Scientific classification
- Kingdom: Animalia
- Phylum: Chordata
- Class: Aves
- Order: Piciformes
- Family: Picidae
- Genus: Yungipicus
- Species: Y. temminckii

Binomial name
- Yungipicus temminckii (Malherbe, 1849)

Synonyms
- Dendrocopos temminckii Picoides temminckii

= Sulawesi pygmy woodpecker =

Species of bird

Sulawesi Pygmy Woodpecker

The Sulawesi pygmy woodpecker (Yungipicus temminckii), also known as the Sulawesi woodpecker, is a species of bird in the family Picidae. It is endemic to Sulawesi in Indonesia. Its natural habitats are subtropical or tropical moist lowland forest and subtropical or tropical moist mountains. Some taxonomic authorities continue to place this species in the genus Dendrocopos or Picoides.
