= Edward Hargitt =

Scottish ornithologist

Edward Hargitt (3 May 1835 – 19 March 1895) was a Scottish ornithologist and landscape painter.

== Biography ==
Edward Hargitt was born in Edinburgh, son of the composer Charles Hargitt. He studied art in the Royal Scottish Academy under Robert Scott Lauder, and painted landscapes, several of which he exhibited at the Royal Academy in Burlington House. After 1880 he specialised in watercolours, often of scenery in the Scottish Highlands, where he spent an increasing amount of his time birdwatching. He studied art under the Scottish landscape painter Horatio MacCulloch. In 1871, he became a member of the Royal Institute of Painters in Watercolours. He contributed a painting to an 1882 book Bedford Park, celebrating the then-fashionable garden suburb of that name.

Hargitt became an ornithologist and developed into an expert on woodpeckers. He made a substantial collection of skins and eggs of European birds, acquired by the British Museum in 1893. He became a member of the Royal Institution and of the British Ornithological Union, and a fellow of the Zoological Society.

He was the author of the monograph on Picidae for the Catalogue of the Birds in the British Museum, published in 1890. During later years, he prepared 1300 drawings of woodpeckers for a proposed monograph. The original 1895 manuscript Book of Reference to the Picidae is kept in the State Darwin Museum in Moscow, Russia.

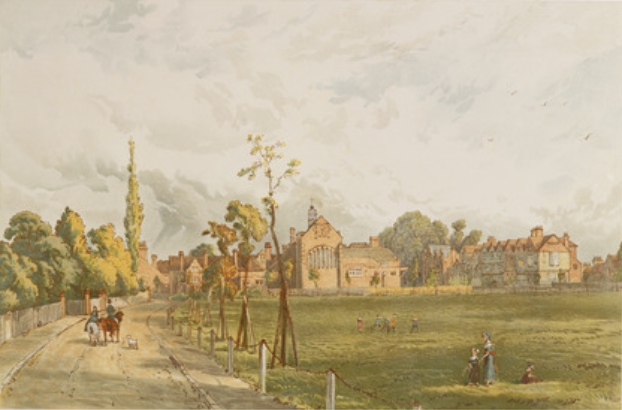
The Church, Tabard Inn and Stores from Acton Green, 1882

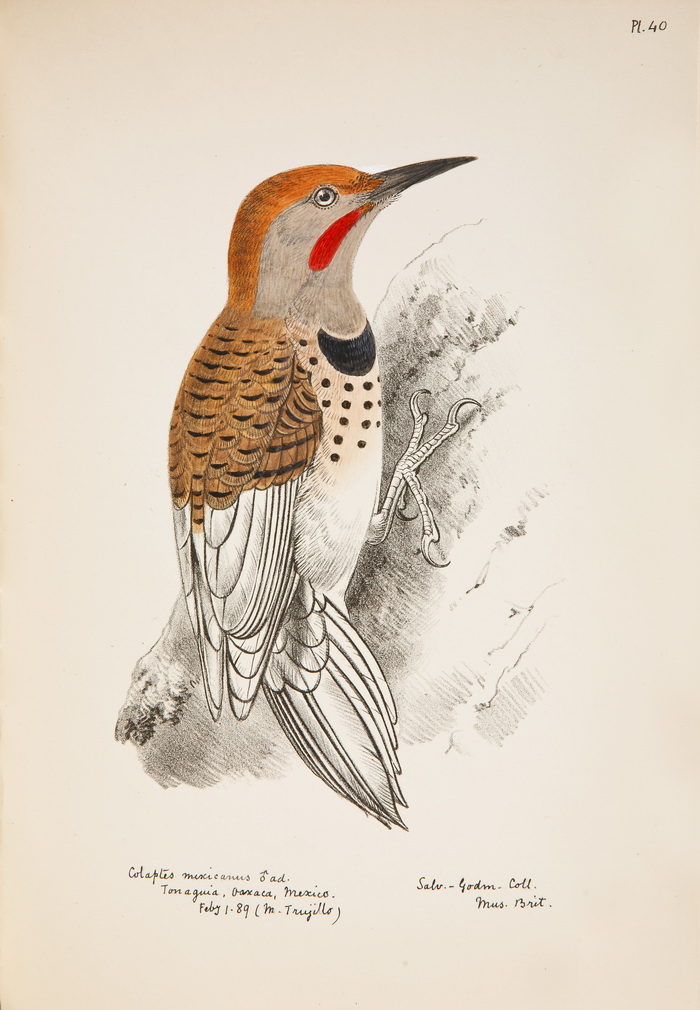
Monograph illustration of the woodpecker Colaptes mexicanus, 1889

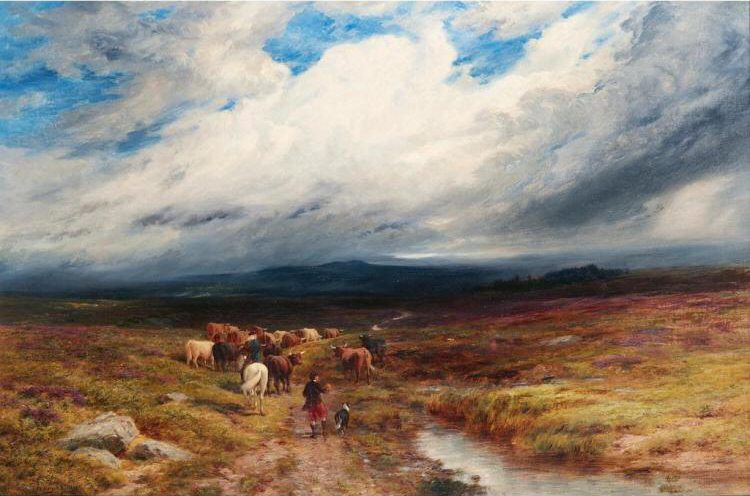
Drover's Road, 1893

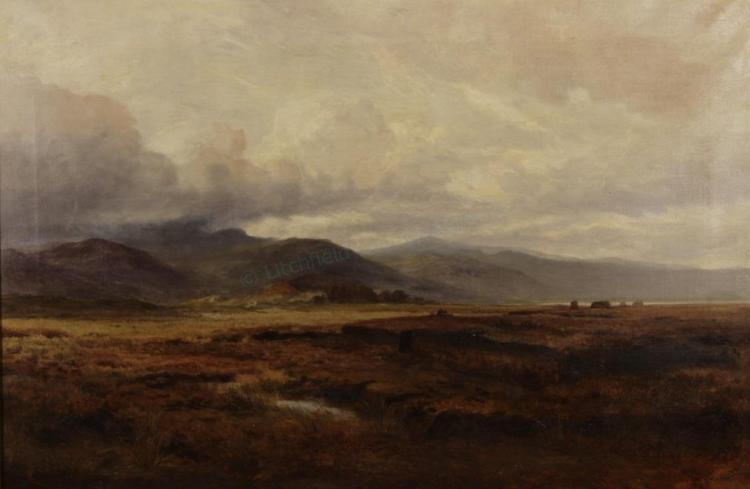
Highland Landscape

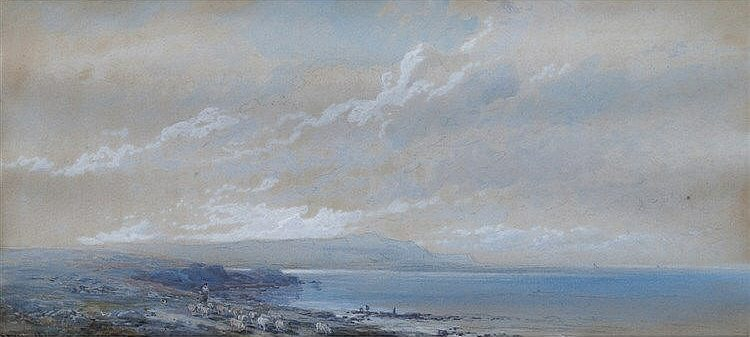
Northern Irish Coast watercolour

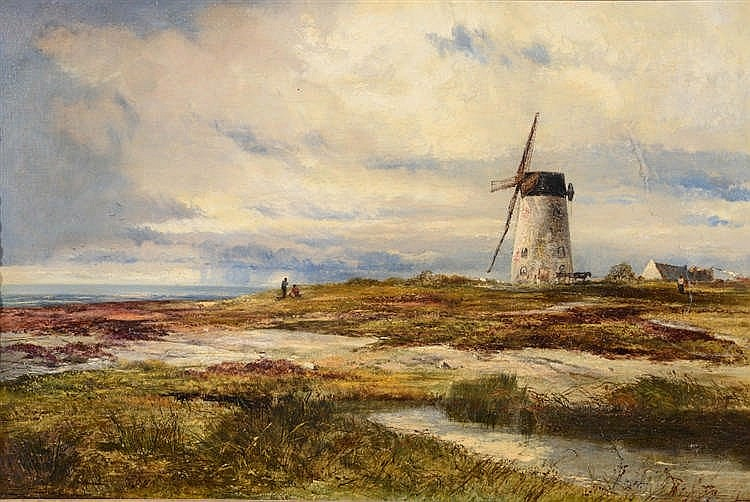
Windmill by the coast, Isle of Man, 1853

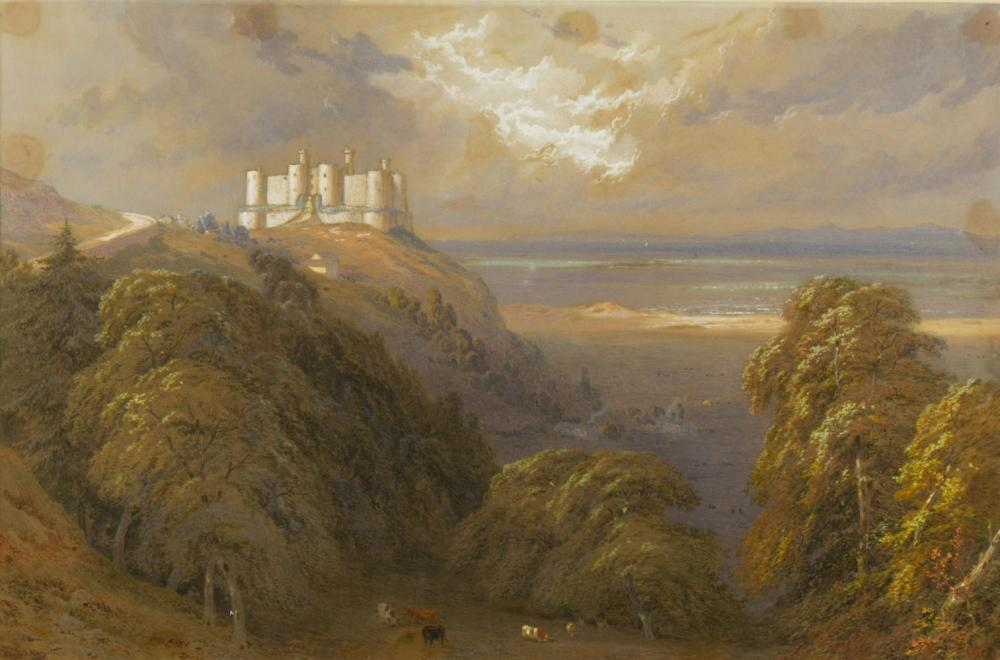
Harlech Castle

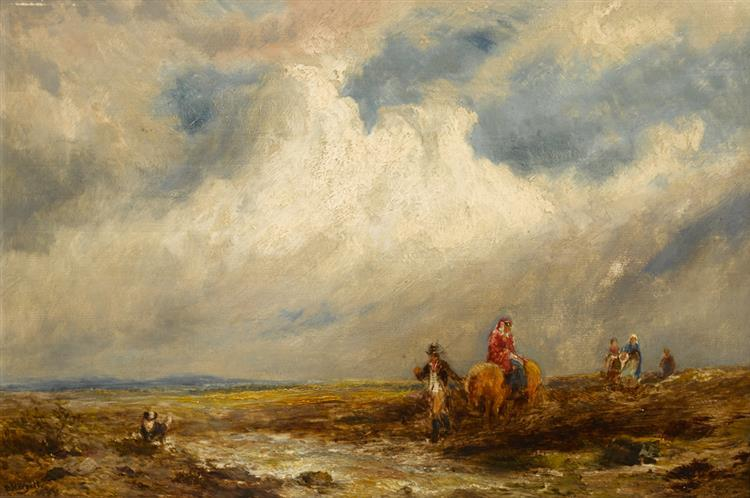
Irish Peasants going to market

After his death, Christie, Manson & Woods auctioned more than 300 of his paintings, mainly watercolours, in 1896.
