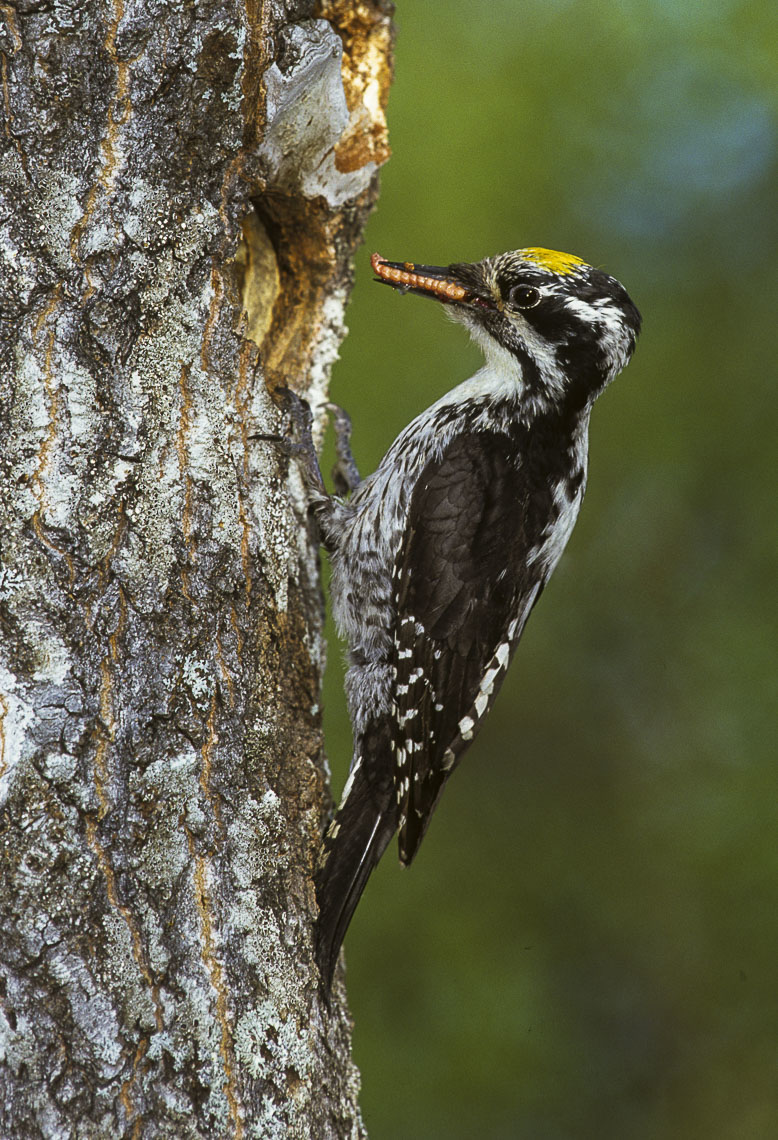

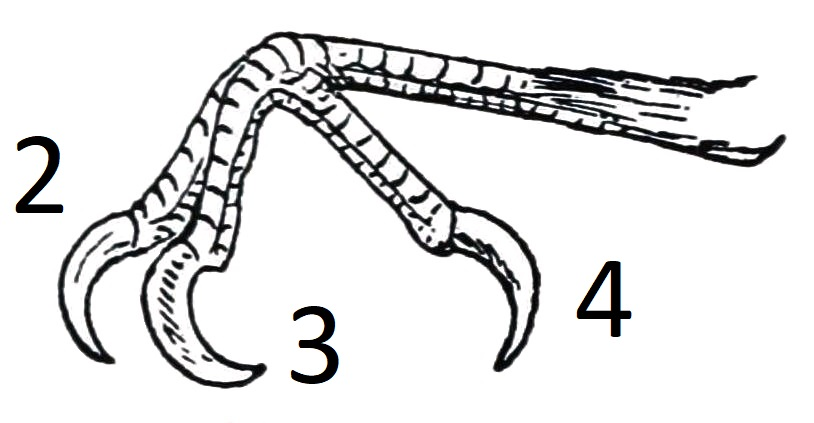
- Eurasian three-toed woodpecker (P. tridactylus), adult male and the three-toed foot which lacks the first digit

Scientific classification
- Kingdom: Animalia
- Phylum: Chordata
- Class: Aves
- Order: Piciformes
- Family: Picidae
- Tribe: Melanerpini
- Genus: Picoides; Lacépède, 1799

Type species
- Picus tridactylus Linnaeus, 1758

Species
- See text.

= Picoides =

Genus of birds

Picoides is a genus of woodpeckers (family Picidae) that are native to Eurasia and North America, commonly known as three-toed woodpeckers.

== Taxonomy ==
The genus Picoides was introduced by the French naturalist Bernard Germain de Lacépède in 1799. The type species was subsequently designated as the Eurasian three-toed woodpecker (Picoides tridactylus) by the English zoologist George Robert Gray in 1840. The genus name combines the Latin Picus for a woodpecker and the Greek -oidēs meaning "resembling". The genus Picoides formerly contained around 12 species. In 2015 a molecular phylogenetic analysis of nuclear and mitochondrial DNA sequences from pied woodpeckers found that three existing genera (Picoides, Veniliornis and Dendropicos) were polyphyletic. After the resurrection of five monophyletic genera and the subsequent rearrangement in which most of the former members of Picoides were moved to Leuconotopicus and Dryobates, only three of the original species remained.

== Description ==
The males of all three species have yellow on the crown, though this feature is also present in some other pied woodpeckers, namely brown-fronted and yellow-crowned. The remaining color pattern of the plumage, structural features, and life habits are very similar to related woodpeckers of the Dryobates and Leuconotopicus genera. The foot of all three species show an extreme adaptation to arboreal living by lacking the first digit, or hallux. It has been pointed out however that various species of pied woodpecker are similar in having a short first digit. Two species of woodpecker in genus Sasia (not closely related) also lack the first digit.

== Habits ==
As opposed to the genera Dryobates and Leuconotopicus, the three species of Picoides obtain most (some 85%) of their insect prey by pecking live or dead wood. The hairy woodpecker (Leuconotopicus villosus) for instance, obtains only 45% of its food by pecking wood, 30% from the surface of trunks and 25% at other places.

== Species ==
The genus contains the following three species:

Genus Picoides – Lacépède, 1799 – three species
Common name	Scientific name and subspecies	Range	Size and ecology	IUCN status and estimated population
Eurasian three-toed woodpecker Male Female	Picoides tridactylus (Linnaeus, 1758) Eight subspecies: P. t. tridactylus (Linnaeus, 1758); P. t. alpinus Brehm, CL, 1831; P. t. crissoleucus (Reichenbach, 1854); P. t. albidior Stejneger, 1885; P. t. tianschanicus Buturlin, 1907; P. t. kurodai Yamashina, 1930; P. t. inouyei Yamashina, 1943; P. t. funebris Verreaux, J, 1871	across northern Eurasia from Norway to Korea.	Size: Habitat: Diet:	LC
American three-toed woodpecker Male	Picoides dorsalis Baird, 1858 Two subspecies: P. d. dorsalis.; P. d. fasciatus	western Canada, Alaska and the western United States	Size: Habitat: Diet:	LC
Black-backed woodpecker Male Female	Picoides arcticus (Swainson, 1832)	Canada, Alaska, the north-western United States	Size: Habitat: Diet:	LC
