= List of birds of Afghanistan =

This is a list of the bird species recorded in Afghanistan. The avifauna of Afghanistan include a total of 503 species, of which 4 have been introduced by humans. Of the species in Afghanistan, 46 species are globally threatened.

This list's taxonomic treatment (designation and sequence of orders, families and species) and nomenclature (common and scientific names) follow the conventions of The Clements Checklist of Birds of the World, 2022 edition. The family accounts at the beginning of each heading reflect this taxonomy, as do the species counts found in each family account. Introduced and accidental species are included in the total counts for Afghanistan.

The following tags have been used to highlight certain aspects of each species.

- (A) Accidental – a species that rarely or accidentally occurs in Afghanistan
- (I) Introduced – a species introduced to Afghanistan as a consequence, direct or indirect, of human actions
- Conservation status – the conservation status of the listed species

== Ducks, geese, and waterfowl ==
Order: Anseriformes Family: Anatidae

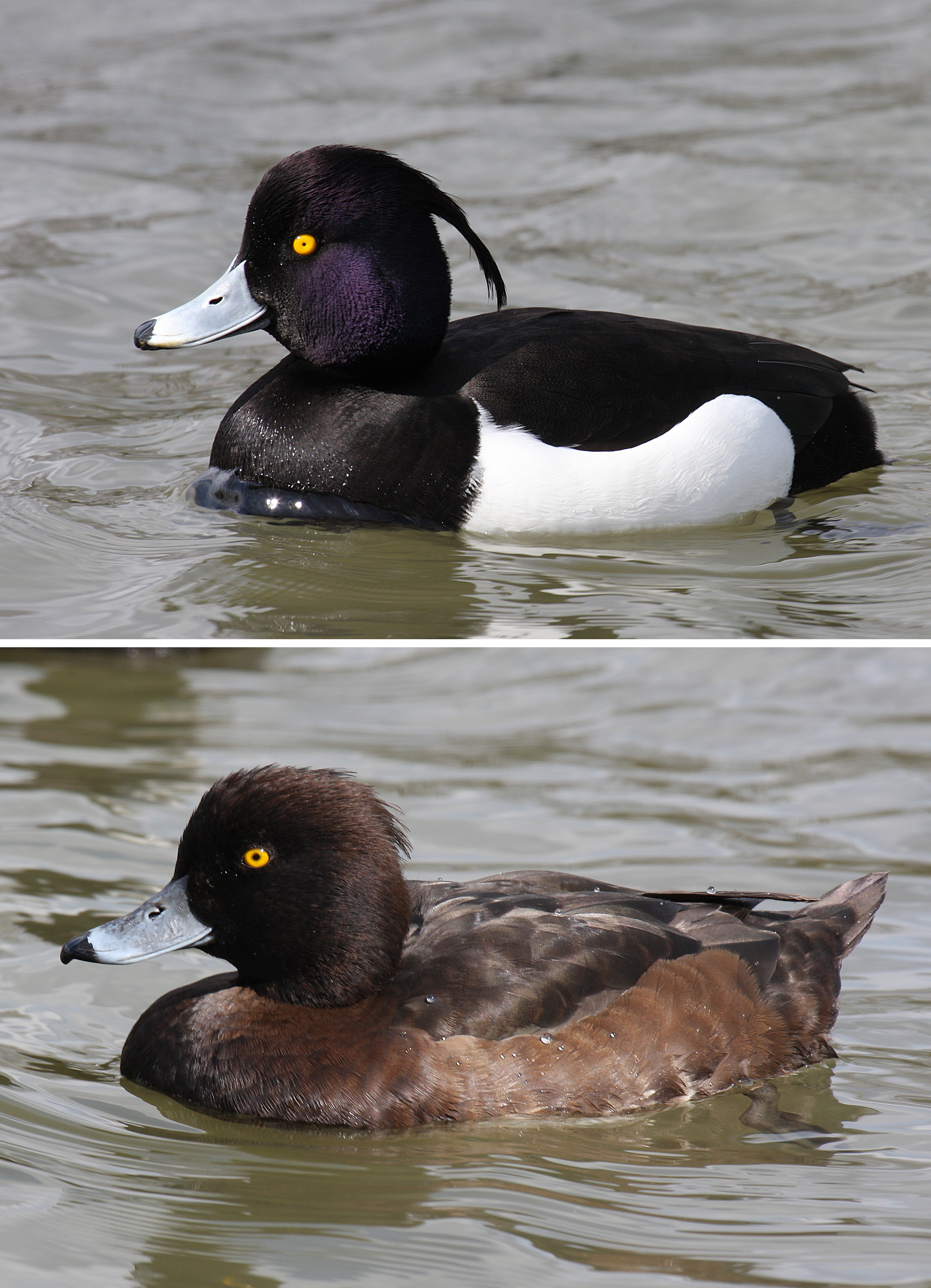
A male and female tufted duck.

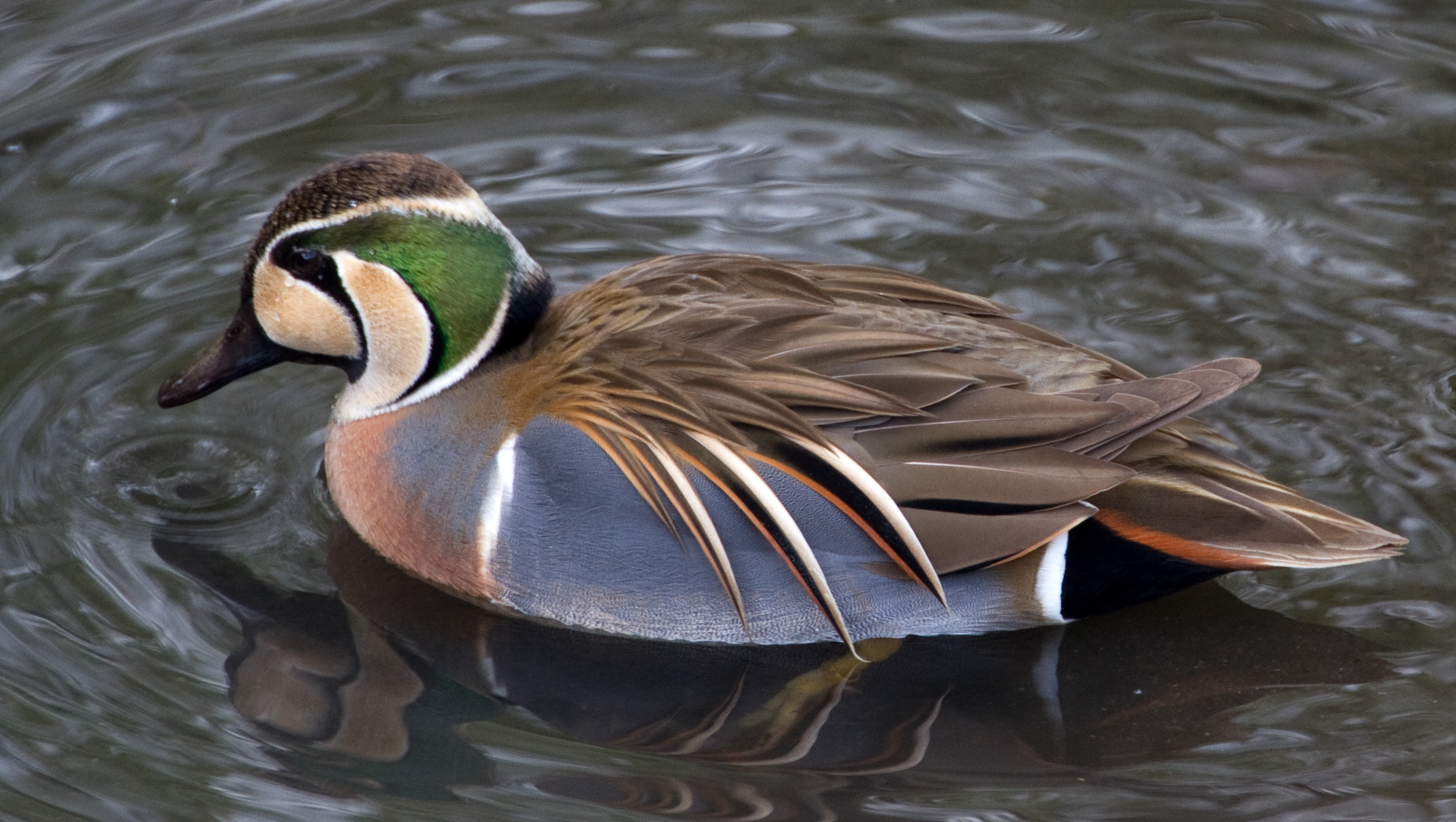
A male baikal teal

Anatidae includes the ducks and most duck-like waterfowl, such as geese and swans. These birds are adapted to an aquatic existence with webbed feet, flattened bills, and feathers that are excellent at shedding water due to an oily coating.

- Bar-headed goose, Anser indicus LC
- Graylag goose, Anser anser LC
- Greater white-fronted goose, Anser albifrons LC
- Lesser white-fronted goose, Anser erythropus VU
- Red-breasted goose, Branta ruficollis VU
- Mute swan, Cygnus olor LC
- Whooper swan, Cygnus cygnus LC
- Ruddy shelduck, Tadorna ferruginea LC
- Common shelduck, Tadorna tadorna LC
- Cotton pygmy goose, Nettapus coromandelianus LC
- Baikal teal, Sibirionetta formosa (A) LC
- Garganey, Spatula querquedula LC
- Northern shoveler, Spatula clypeata LC
- Gadwall, Mareca strepera LC
- Falcated duck, Mareca falcata (A) NT
- Eurasian wigeon, Mareca penelope LC
- Mallard, Anas platyrhynchos LC
- Northern pintail, Anas acuta LC
- Eurasian teal, Anas crecca LC
- Marbled duck, Marmaronetta angustirostris NT
- Red-crested pochard, Netta rufina LC
- Common pochard, Aythya ferina VU
- Ferruginous duck, Aythya nyroca NT
- Tufted duck, Aythya fuligula LC
- Greater scaup, Aythya marila LC
- Velvet scoter, Melanitta fusca (A) VU
- Common goldeneye, Bucephala clangula LC
- Smew, Mergellus albellus LC
- Common merganser, Mergus merganser LC
- Red-breasted merganser, Mergus serrator (A) LC
- White-headed duck, Oxyura leucocephala EN

== Pheasants, grouse, and allies ==
Order: Galliformes Family: Phasianidae

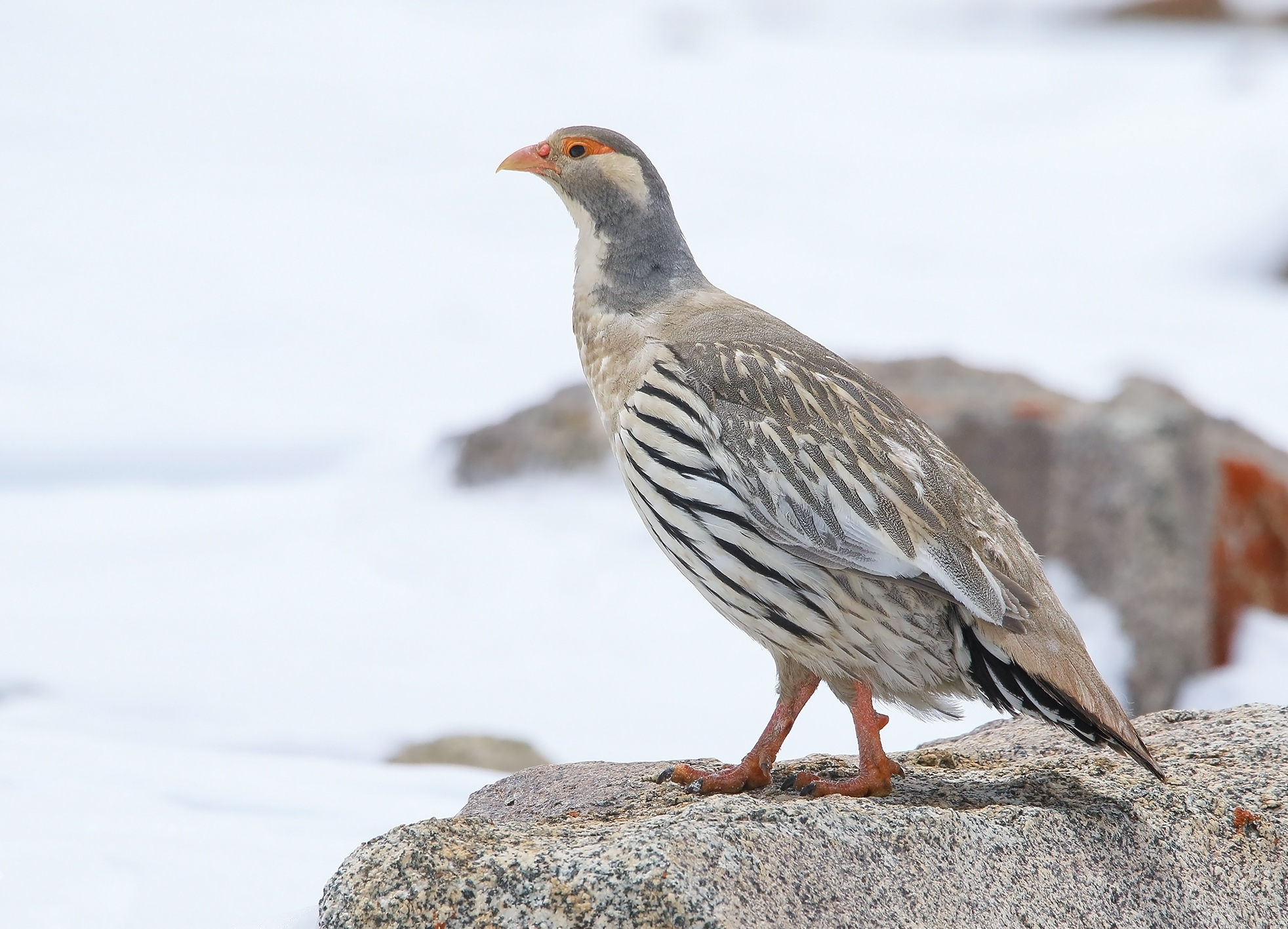
Tibetan snowcock

The Phasianidae are a family of terrestrial birds. In general, they are plump (although they vary in size) and have broad, relatively short wings.

- See-see partridge, Ammoperdix griseogularis LC
- Common quail, Coturnix coturnix LC
- Chukar, Alectoris chukar LC
- Tibetan snowcock, Tetraogallus tibetanus LC
- Himalayan snowcock, Tetraogallus himalayensis LC
- Black francolin, Francolinus francolinus LC
- Gray francolin, Ortygornis pondicerianus LC
- Himalayan monal, Lophophorus impejanus LC
- Common pheasant, Phasianus colchicus LC
- Cheer pheasant, Catreus wallichii VU
- Gray partridge, Perdix perdix LC
- Koklass pheasant, Pucrasia macrolopha LC

== Flamingos ==
Order: Phoenicopteriformes Family: Phoenicopteridae

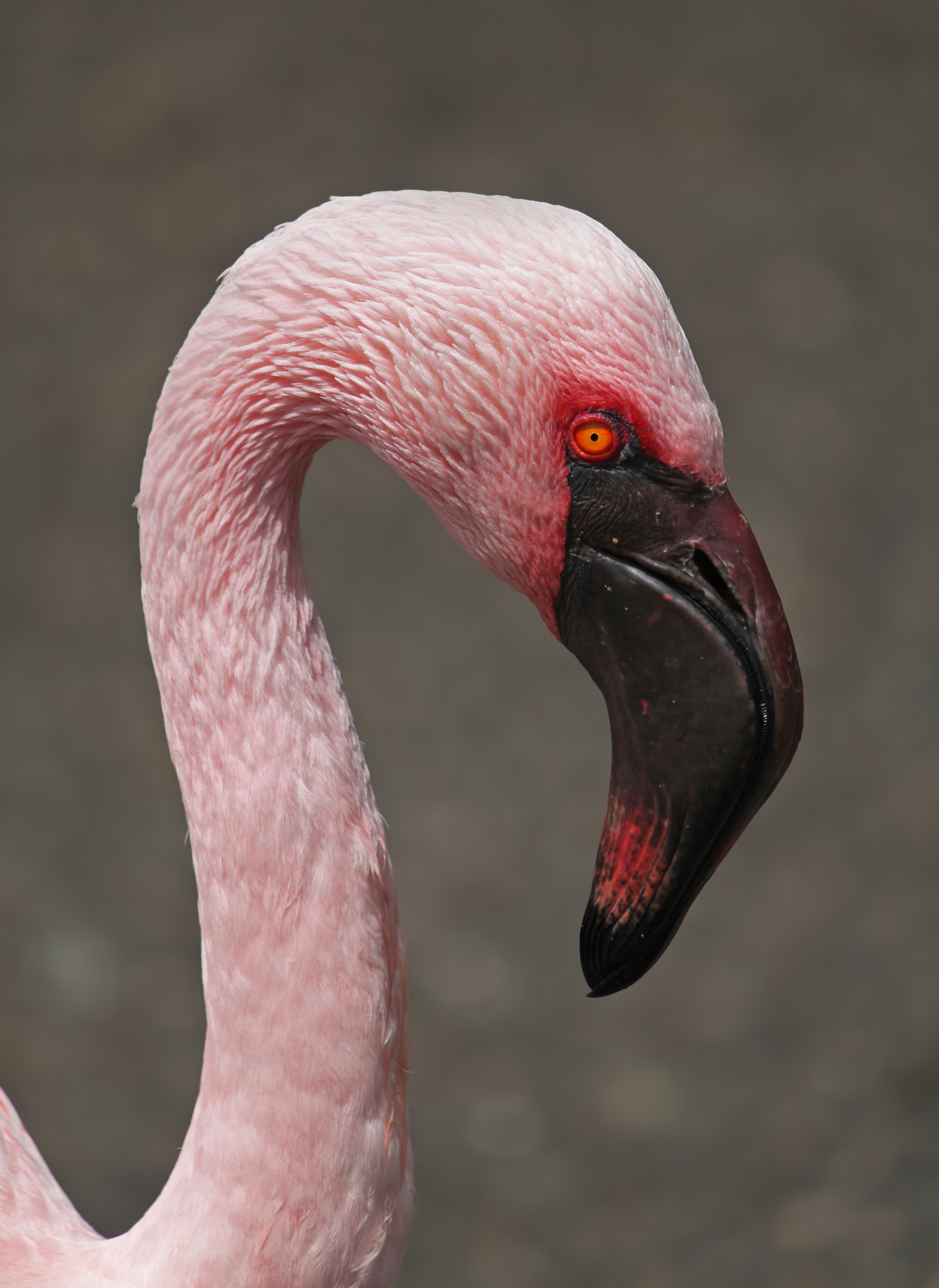
Lesser flamingo

Flamingos are gregarious wading birds, usually 3 to 5 feet (0.9 to 1.5 m) tall, found in both the Western and Eastern Hemispheres. Flamingos filter-feed on shellfish and algae. Their oddly shaped beaks are specially adapted to separate mud and silt from the food they consume and, uniquely, are used upside-down.

- Greater flamingo, Phoenicopterus roseus LC
- Lesser flamingo, Phoenicopterus minor (A) NT

== Grebes ==
Order: Podicipediformes Family: Podicipedidae

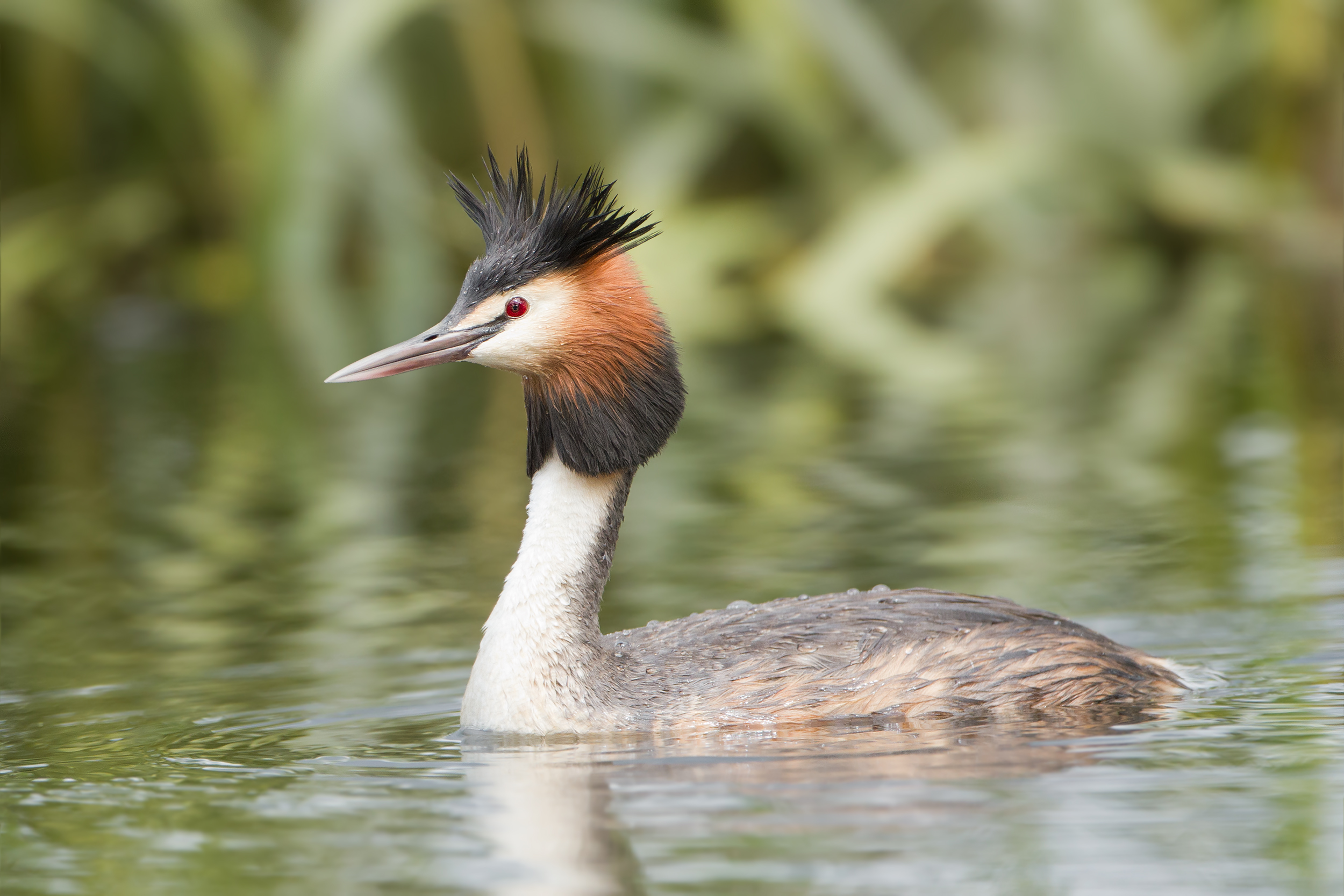
Great crested grebe

Grebes are small to medium-large freshwater diving birds. They have lobed toes and are excellent swimmers and divers. However, they have their feet placed far back on the body, making them quite ungainly on land.

- Little grebe, Tachybaptus ruficollis LC
- Red-necked grebe, Podiceps grisegena LC
- Great crested grebe, Podiceps cristatus LC
- Black-necked grebe, Podiceps nigricollis LC

== Pigeons and doves ==
Order: Columbiformes Family: Columbidae

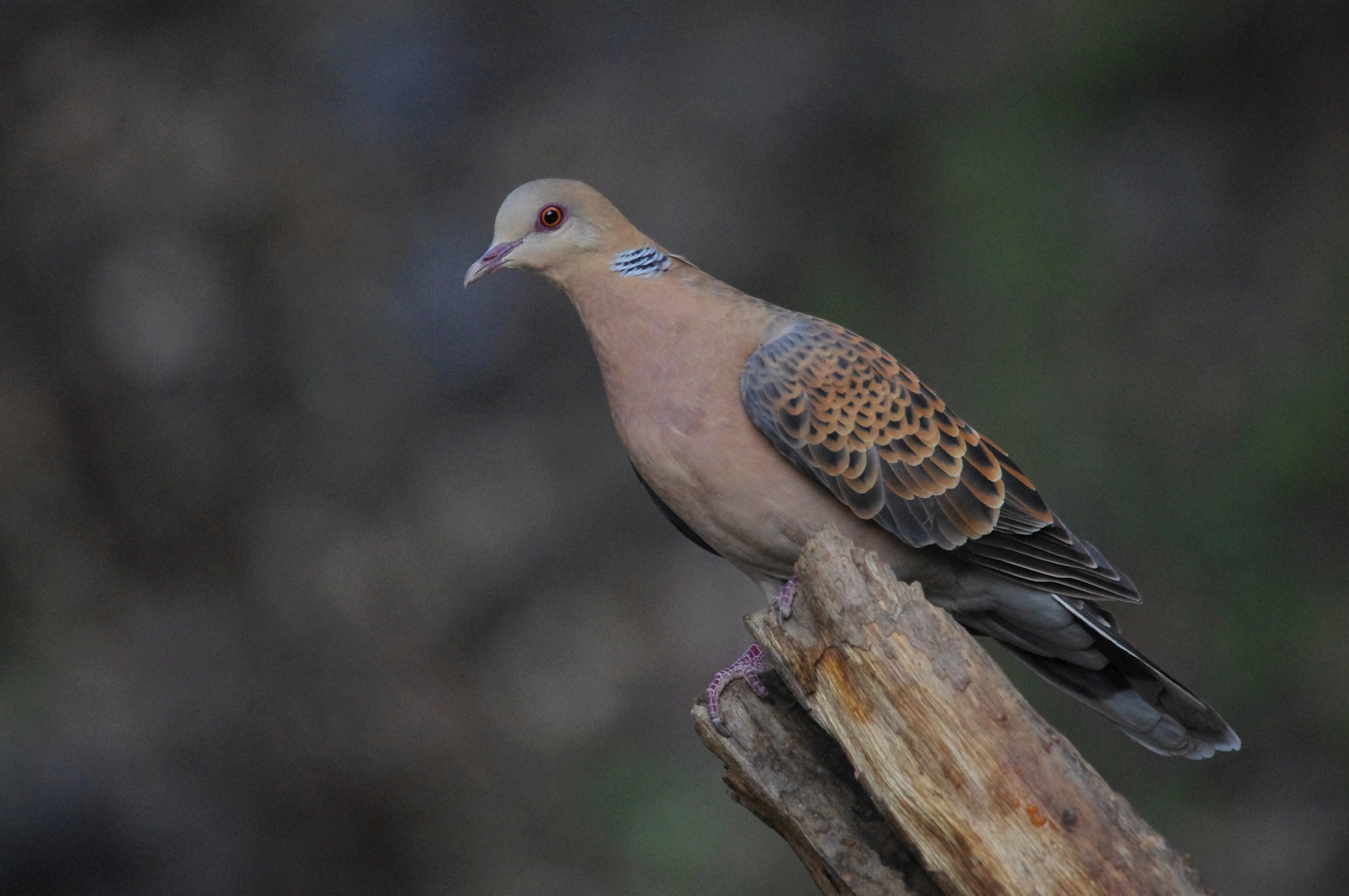
Oriental turtle-dove

Pigeons and doves are stout-bodied birds with short necks and short slender bills with a fleshy cere.

- Rock dove, Columba livia LC
- Hill pigeon, Columba rupestris LC
- Snow pigeon, Columba leuconota LC
- Speckled pigeon, Columba guinea (I) LC
- Stock dove, Columba oenas (A) LC
- Yellow-eyed pigeon, Columba eversmanni VU
- Common wood-pigeon, Columba palumbus LC
- European turtle-dove, Streptopelia turtur VU
- Oriental turtle-dove, Streptopelia orientalis LC
- Eurasian collared-dove, Streptopelia decaocto LC
- Spotted dove, Spilopelia chinensis (A) LC
- Laughing dove, Spilopelia senegalensis LC

== Sandgrouse ==
Order: Pterocliformes Family: Pteroclidae

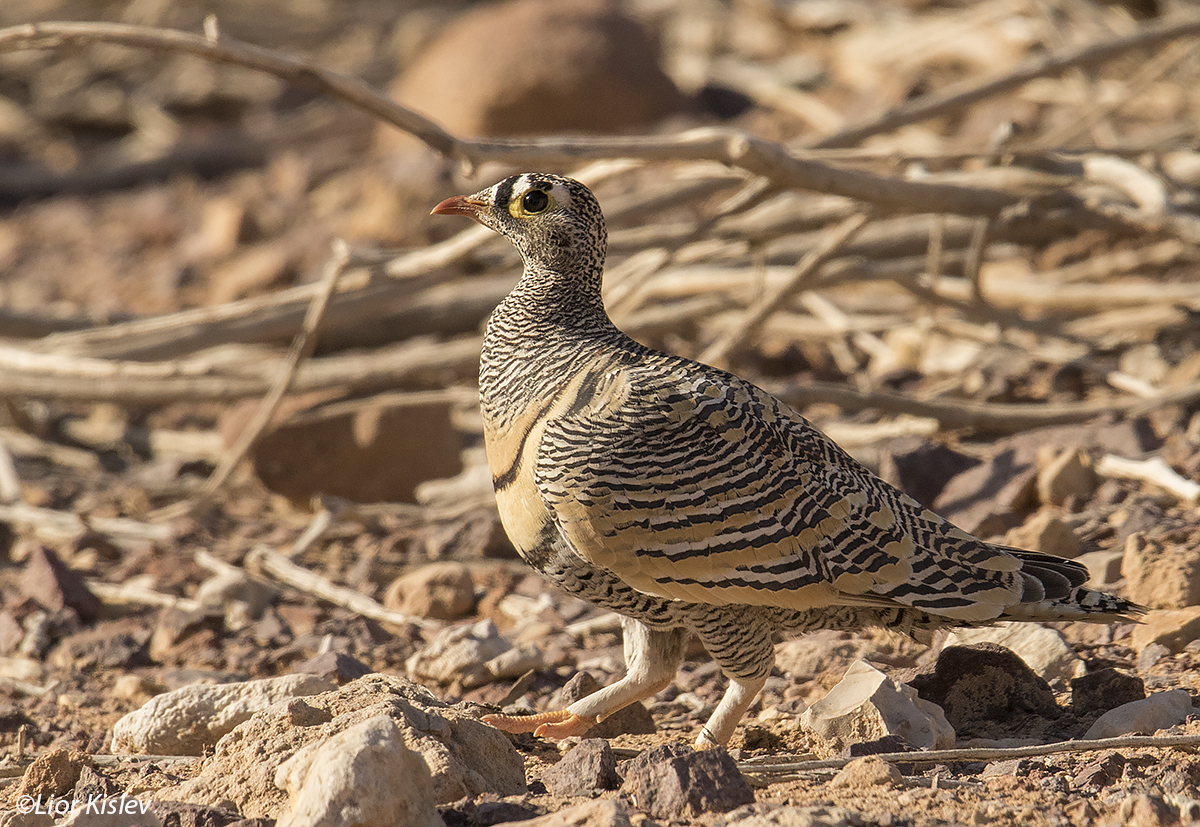
Lichtenstein's sandgrouse

Sandgrouse have small, pigeon like heads and necks, but sturdy compact bodies. They have long pointed wings and sometimes tails and a fast direct flight. Flocks fly to watering holes at dawn and dusk. Their legs are feathered down to the toes.

- Tibetan sandgrouse, Syrrhaptes tibetanus LC
- Pin-tailed sandgrouse, Pterocles alchata LC
- Spotted sandgrouse, Pterocles senegallus (A) LC
- Black-bellied sandgrouse, Pterocles orientalis LC
- Crowned sandgrouse, Pterocles coronatus LC
- Lichtenstein's sandgrouse, Pterocles lichtensteinii LC

== Bustards ==
Order: Otidiformes Family: Otididae

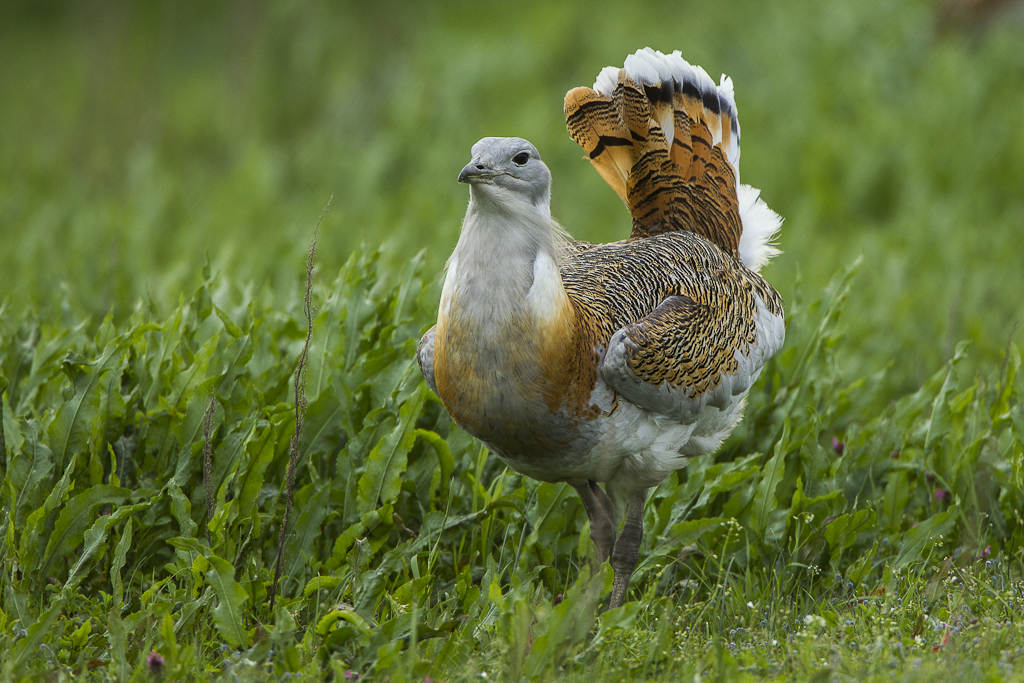
Great bustard

Bustards are large terrestrial birds mainly associated with dry open country and steppes in the Old World. They are omnivorous and nest on the ground. They walk steadily on strong legs and big toes, pecking for food as they go. They have long broad wings with "fingered" wingtips and striking patterns in flight. Many have interesting mating displays.

- Great bustard, Otis tarda EN
- MacQueen's bustard, Chlamydotis macqueenii VU
- Little bustard, Tetrax tetrax NT

== Cuckoos ==
Order: Cuculiformes Family: Cuculidae

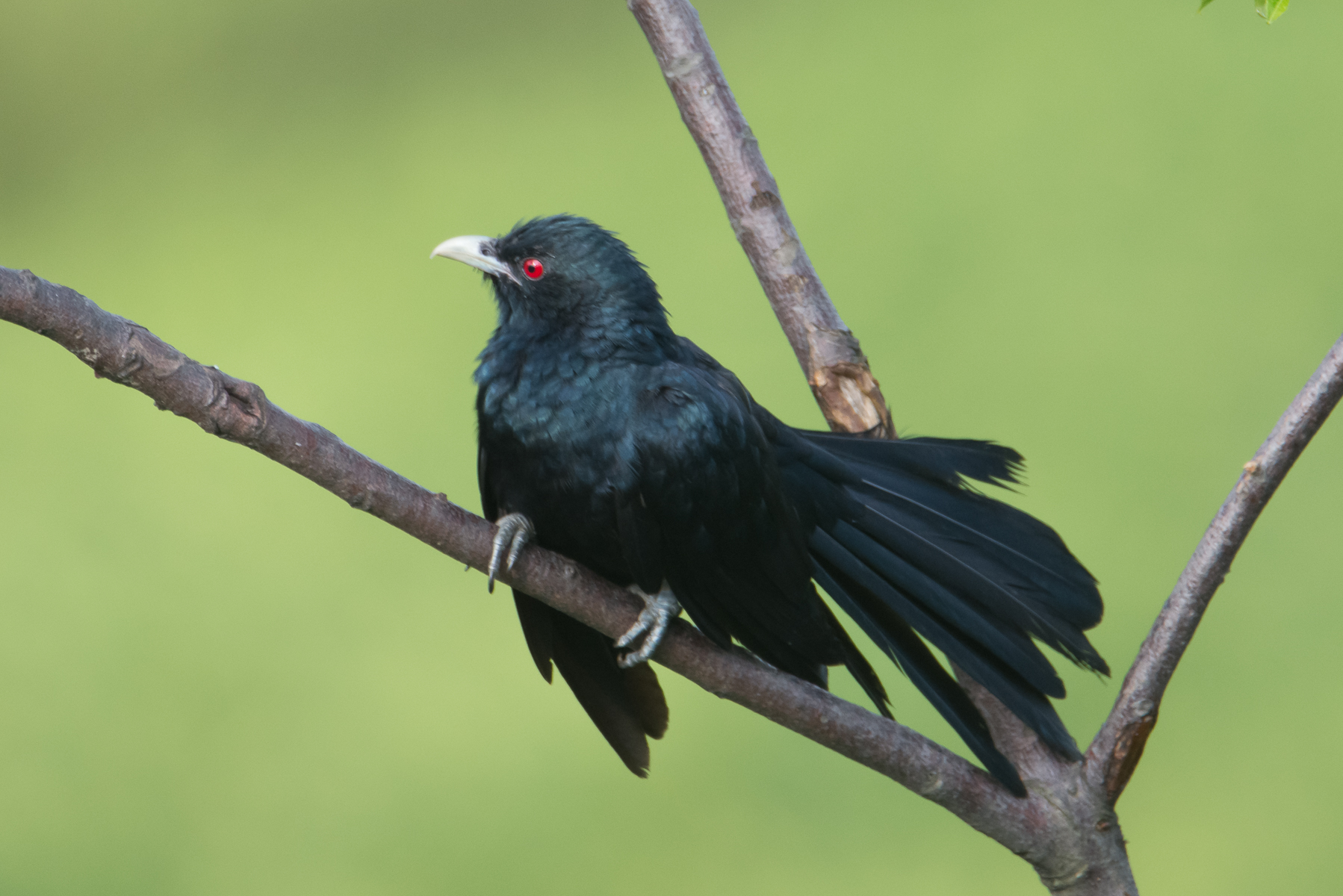
Asian koel

The family Cuculidae includes cuckoos, roadrunners and anis. These birds are of variable size with slender bodies, long tails and strong legs.

- Jacobin cuckoo, Clamator jacobinus (A) LC
- Asian koel, Eudynamys scolopaceus LC
- Lesser cuckoo, Cuculus poliocephalus LC
- Common cuckoo, Cuculus canorus LC

== Nightjars and allies ==
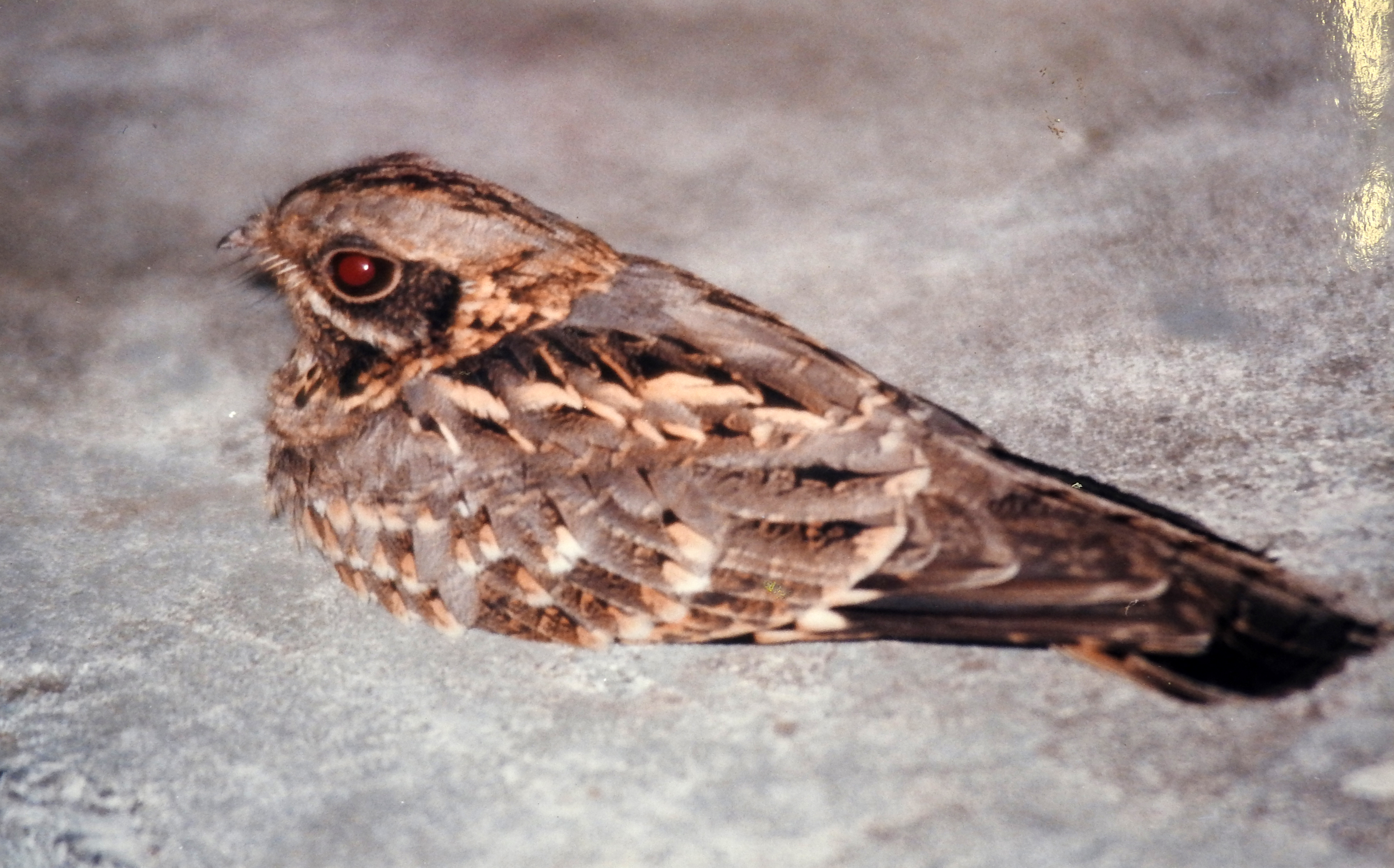
Indian nightjar

Order: Caprimulgiformes Family: Caprimulgidae

Nightjars are medium-sized nocturnal birds that usually nest on the ground. They have long wings, short legs and very short bills. Most have small feet, of little use for walking, and long pointed wings. Their soft plumage is camouflaged to resemble bark or leaves.

- Eurasian nightjar, Caprimulgus europaeus LC
- Egyptian nightjar, Caprimulgus aegyptius LC
- Sykes's nightjar, Caprimulgus mahrattensis LC
- Indian nightjar, Caprimulgus asiaticus LC

== Swifts ==
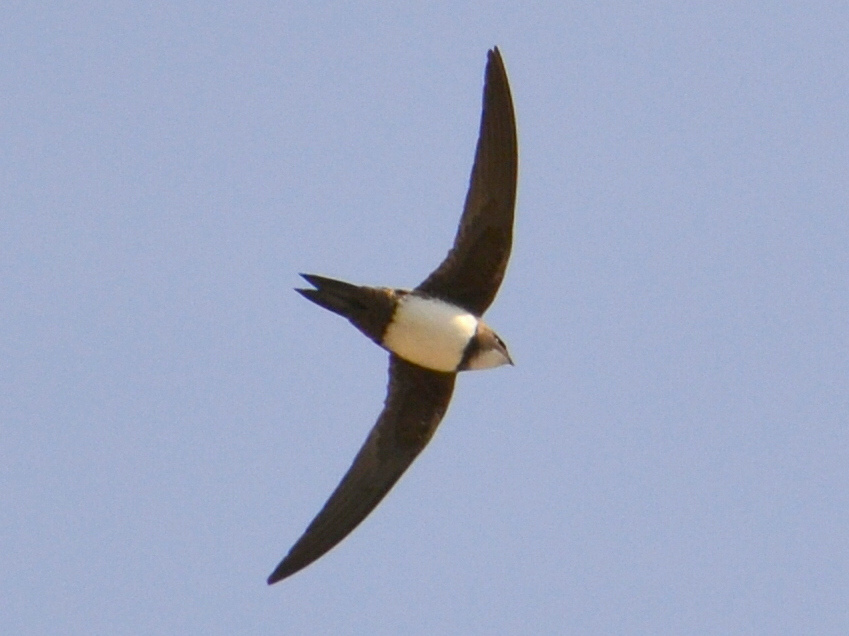
An alpine swift in flight

Order: Caprimulgiformes Family: Apodidae

Swifts are small birds which spend the majority of their lives flying. These birds have very short legs and never settle voluntarily on the ground, perching instead only on vertical surfaces. Many swifts have long swept-back wings which resemble a crescent or boomerang.

- White-throated needletail, Hirundapus caudacutus (A) LC
- Alpine swift, Apus melba LC
- Common swift, Apus apus LC
- Little swift, Apus affinis LC

== Rails, gallinules and coots ==
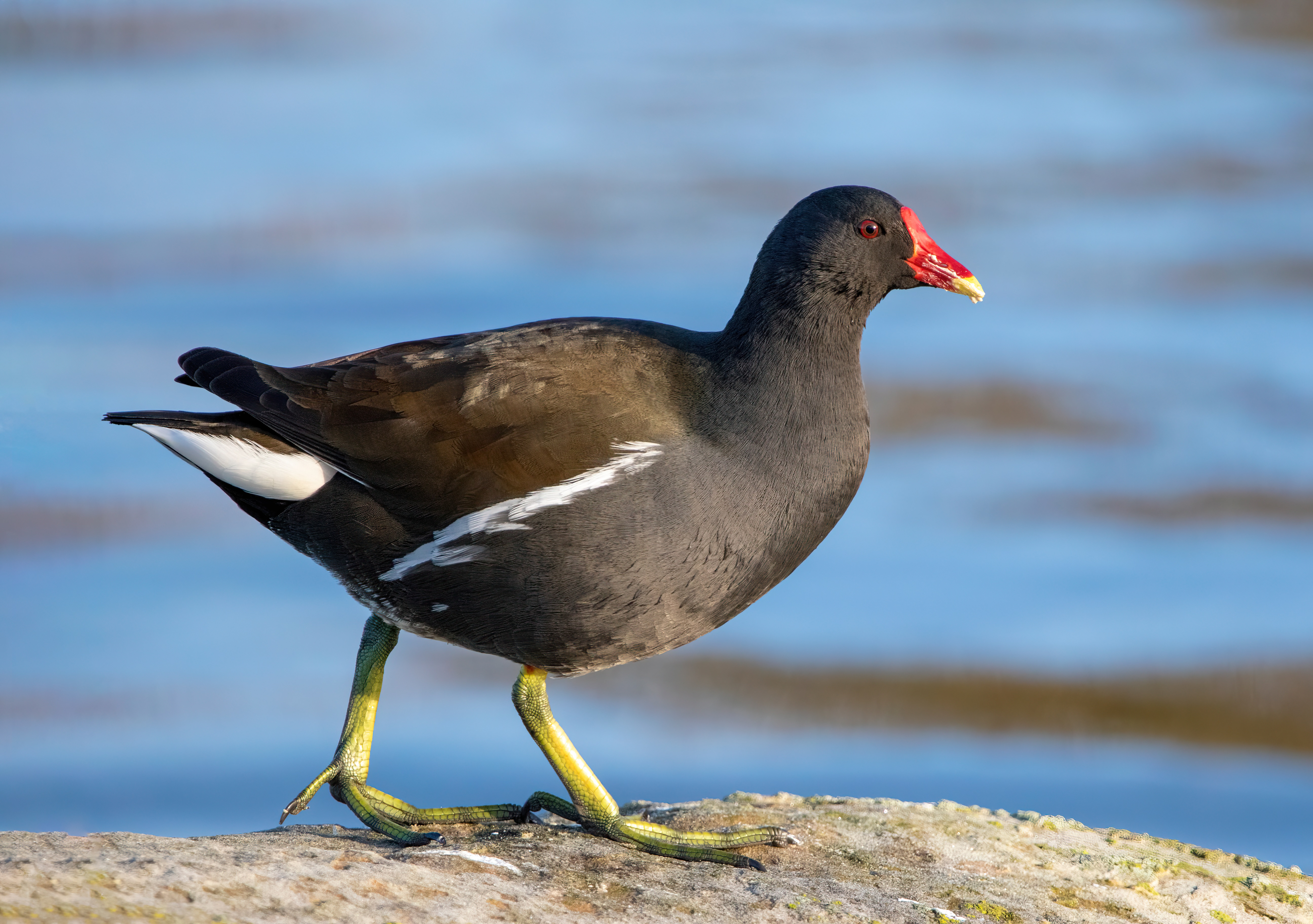
Eurasian moorhen

Order: Gruiformes Family: Rallidae

Rallidae is a large family of small to medium-sized birds which includes the rails, crakes, coots and gallinules. Typically they inhabit dense vegetation in damp environments near lakes, swamps or rivers. In general they are shy and secretive birds, making them difficult to observe. Most species have strong legs and long toes which are well adapted to soft uneven surfaces. They tend to have short, rounded wings and to be weak fliers.

- Water rail, Rallus aquaticus LC
- Corn crake, Crex crex LC
- Spotted crake, Porzana porzana LC
- Common moorhen, Gallinula chloropus LC
- Eurasian coot, Fulica atra LC
- Gray-headed swamphen, Porphyrio poliocephalus NE
- Ruddy-breasted crake, Zapornia fusca (A) LC
- Little crake, Zapornia parva LC
- Baillon's crake, Zapornia pusilla LC

== Cranes ==
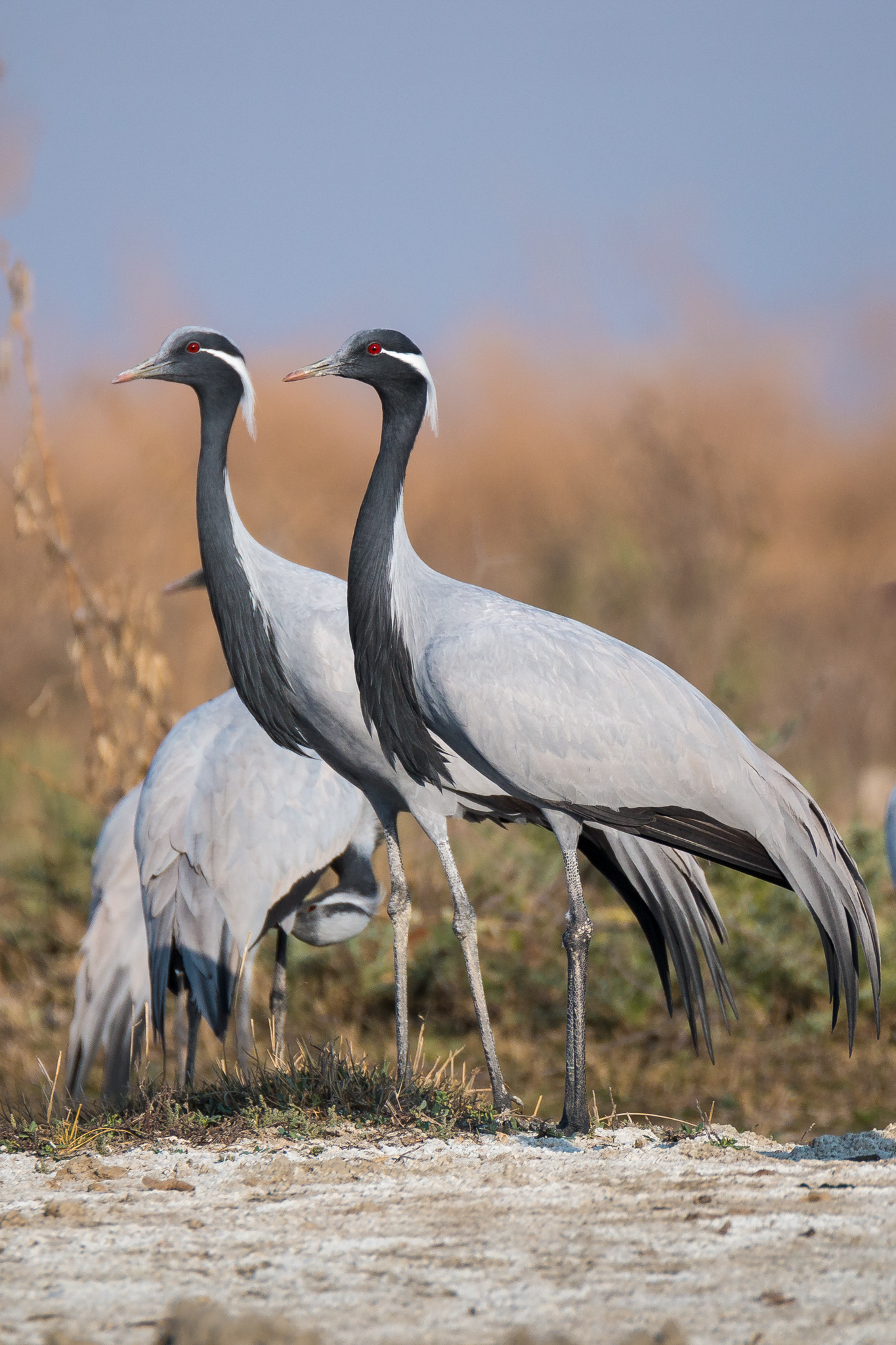
A pair of demoiselle cranes

Order: Gruiformes Family: Gruidae

Cranes are large, long-legged and long-necked birds. Unlike the similar-looking but unrelated herons, cranes fly with necks outstretched, not pulled back. Most have elaborate and noisy courting displays or "dances".

- Demoiselle crane, Anthropoides virgo LC
- Siberian crane, Leucogeranus leucogeranus (A) (possibly extirpated) CR
- Common crane, Grus grus LC

== Stone-curlews ==
Order: Charadriiformes Family: Burhinidae

The stone-curlews are a group of largely tropical waders in the family Burhinidae. They are found worldwide within the tropical zone, with some species also breeding in temperate Europe and Australia. They are medium to large waders with strong black or yellow-black bills, large yellow eyes and cryptic plumage. Despite being classed as waders, most species have a preference for arid or semi-arid habitats.

- Eurasian stone-curlew, Burhinus oedicnemus LC

== Stilts and avocets ==
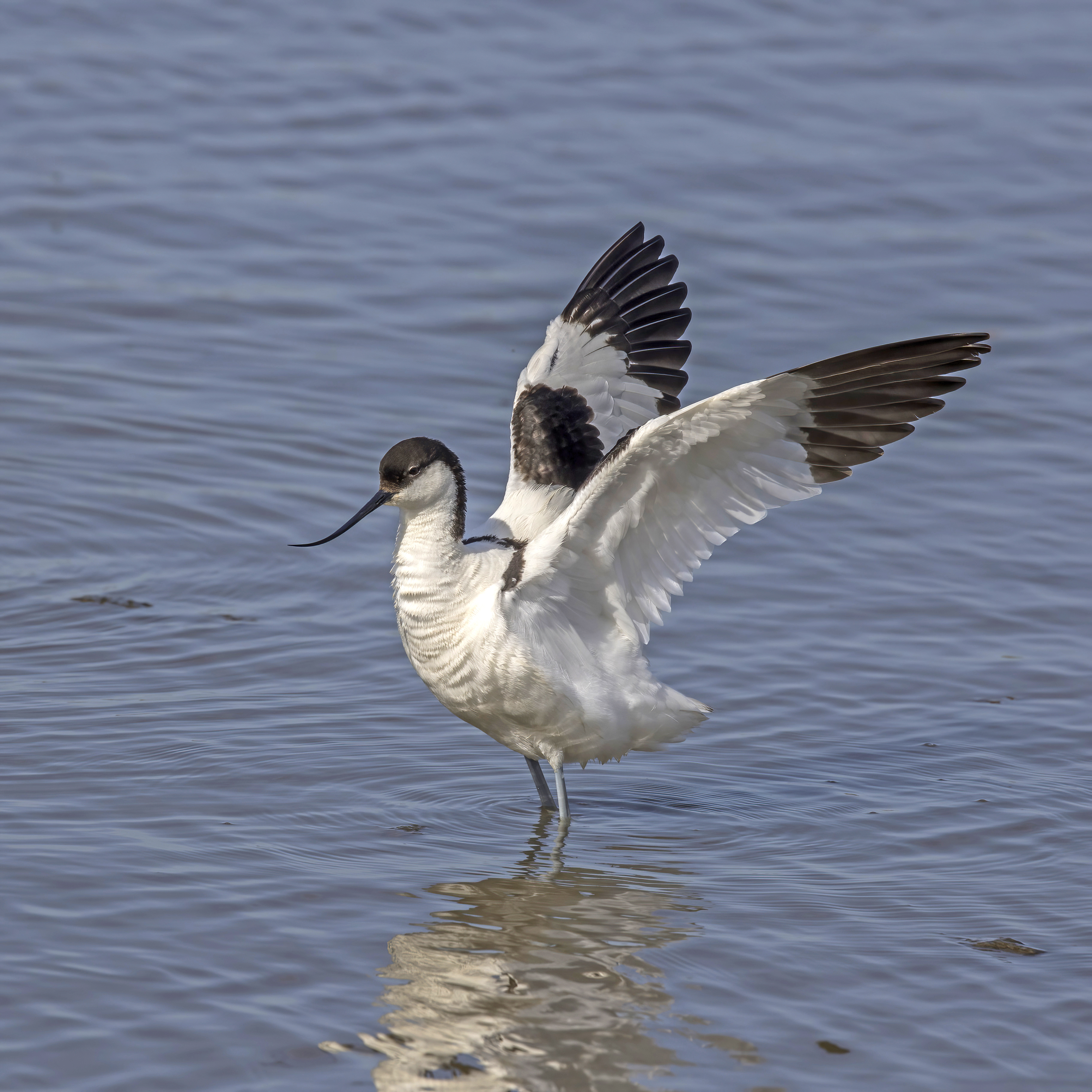
A wading pied avocet

Order: Charadriiformes Family: Recurvirostridae

Recurvirostridae is a family of large wading birds, which includes the avocets and stilts. The avocets have long legs and long up-curved bills. The stilts have extremely long legs and long, thin, straight bills.

- Black-winged stilt, Himantopus himantopus LC
- Pied avocet, Recurvirostra avosetta LC

== Ibisbill ==
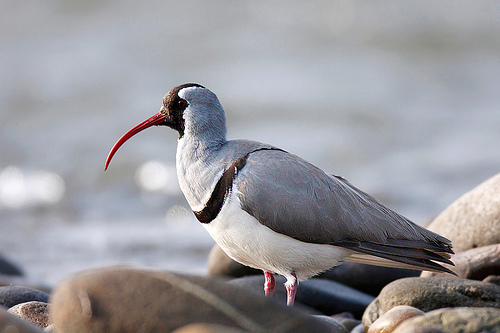
An ibisbill on a shoreline

Order: Charadriiformes Family: Ibidorhynchidae

The ibisbill is related to the waders, but is sufficiently distinctive to be a family unto itself. The adult is gray with a white belly, red legs, a long down curved bill, and a black face and breast band.

- Ibisbill, Ibidorhyncha struthersii (A) LC

== Oystercatchers ==
Order: Charadriiformes Family: Haematopodidae

The oystercatchers are large and noisy plover-like birds, with strong bills used for smashing or prising open molluscs.

- Eurasian oystercatcher, Haematopus ostralegus NT

== Plovers and lapwings ==
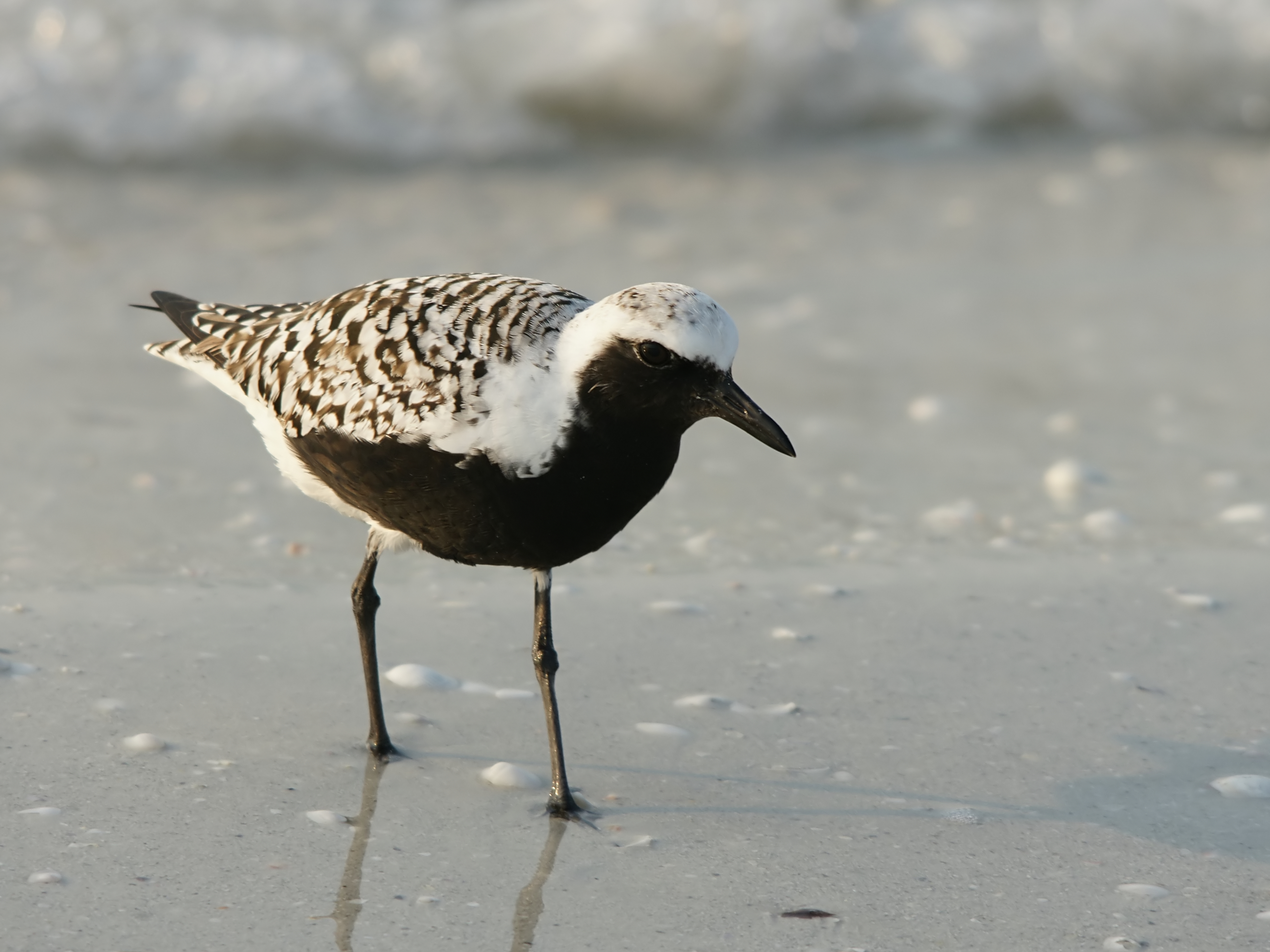
A black-bellied plover in breeding plumage

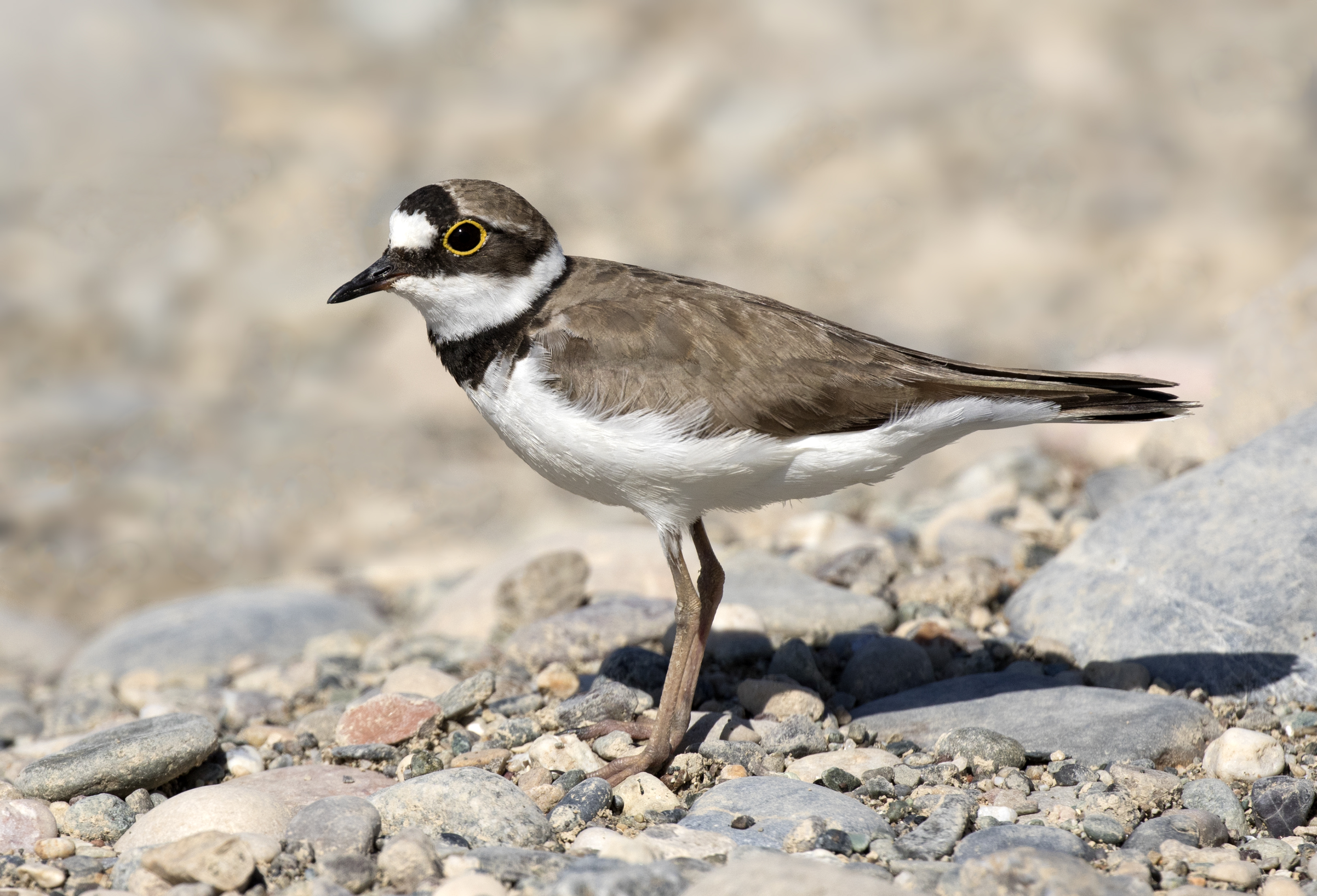
Little ringed plover

Order: Charadriiformes Family: Charadriidae

The family Charadriidae includes the plovers, dotterels and lapwings. They are small to medium-sized birds with compact bodies, short, thick necks and long, usually pointed, wings. They are found in open country worldwide, mostly in habitats near water.

- Grey plover, Pluvialis squatarola LC
- Pacific golden plover, Pluvialis fulva (A) LC
- Northern lapwing, Vanellus vanellus NT
- Red-wattled lapwing, Vanellus indicus LC
- Sociable lapwing, Vanellus gregarius CR
- White-tailed lapwing, Vanellus leucurus LC
- Siberian sand plover, Charadrius mongolus EN
- Greater sand plover, Charadrius leschenaultii LC
- Caspian plover, Charadrius asiaticus LC
- Kentish plover, Charadrius alexandrinus LC
- Common ringed plover, Charadrius hiaticula LC
- Little ringed plover, Charadrius dubius LC

== Painted-snipes ==
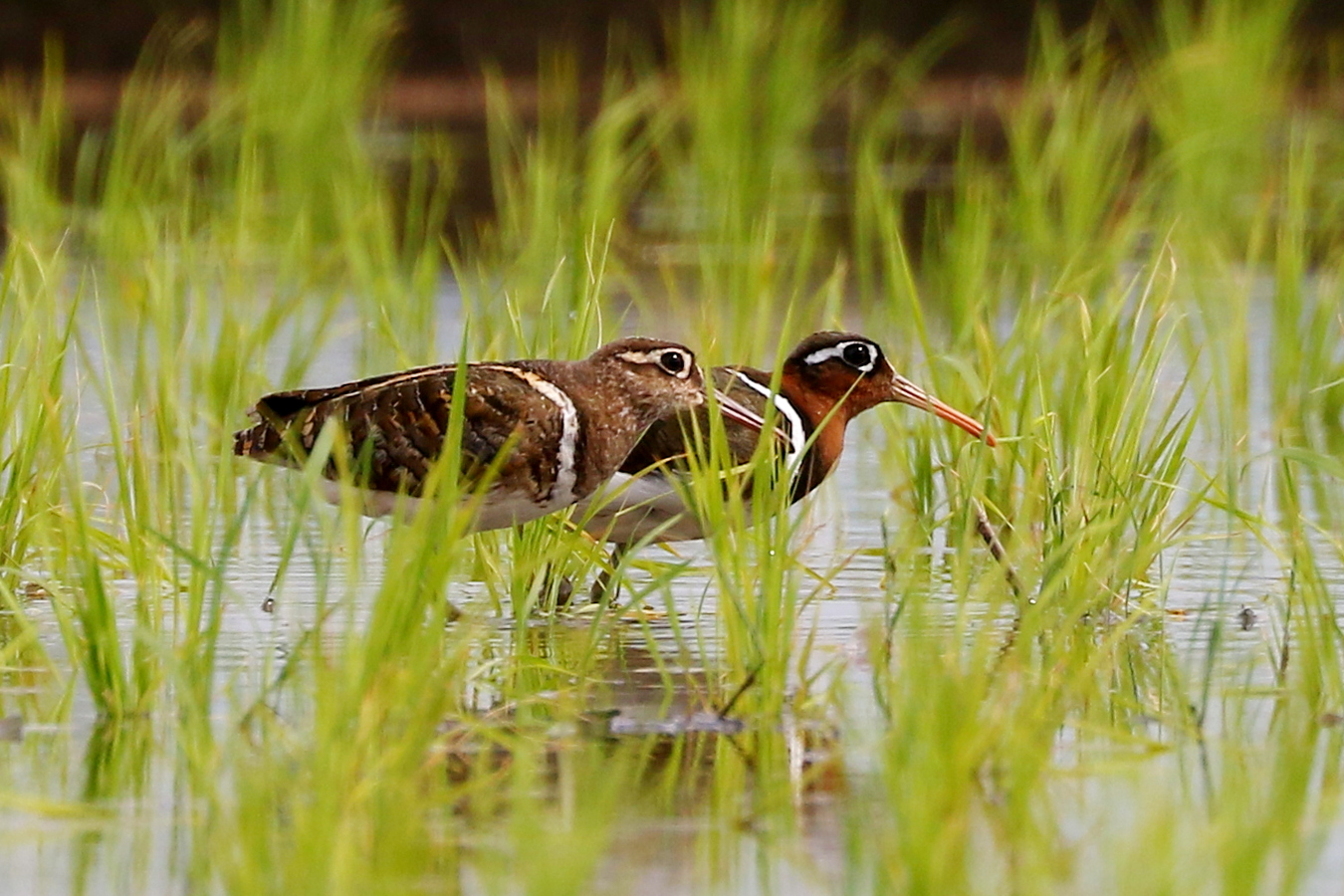
A pair of greater painted-snipes

Order: Charadriiformes Family: Rostratulidae

Painted-snipes are short-legged, long-billed birds similar in shape to the true snipes, but more brightly coloured.

- Greater painted-snipe, Rostratula benghalensis LC

== Jacanas ==
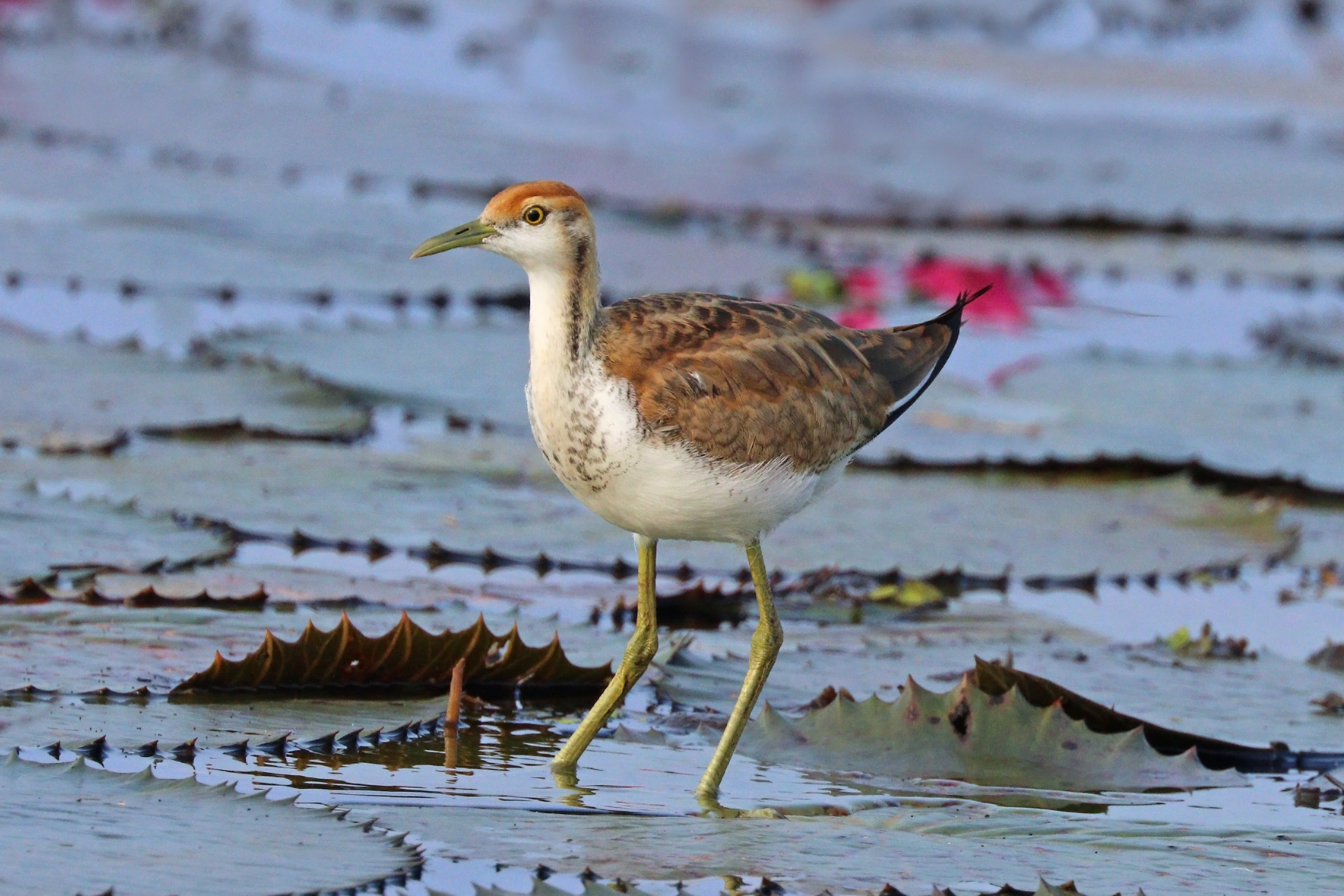
A juvenile pheasant-tailed jacana

Order: Charadriiformes Family: Jacanidae

The jacanas are a group of tropical waders in the family Jacanidae. They are found throughout the tropics. They are identifiable by their huge feet and claws which enable them to walk on floating vegetation in the shallow lakes that are their preferred habitat.

- Pheasant-tailed jacana, Hydrophasianus chirurgus LC

== Sandpipers and allies ==
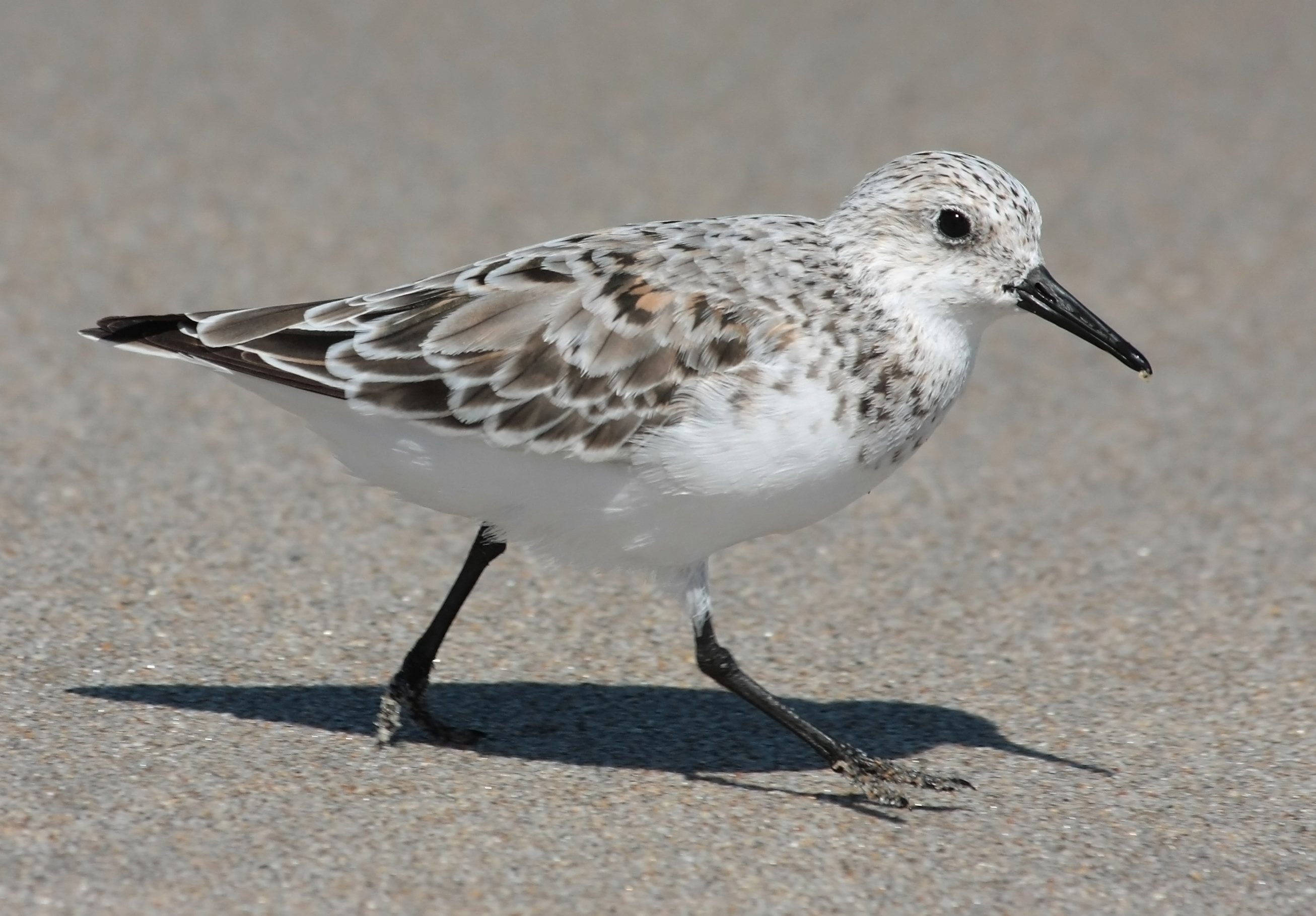
Sanderling

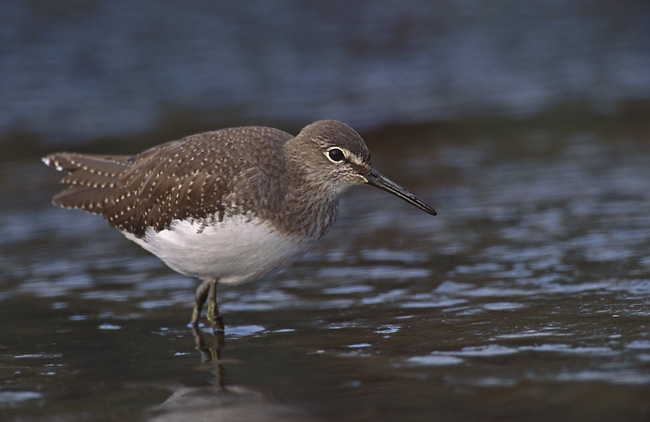
A wading green sandpiper

Order: Charadriiformes Family: Scolopacidae

Scolopacidae is a large diverse family of small to medium-sized shorebirds including the sandpipers, curlews, godwits, shanks, tattlers, woodcocks, snipes, dowitchers and phalaropes. The majority of these species eat small invertebrates picked out of the mud or soil. Variation in length of legs and bills enables multiple species to feed in the same habitat, particularly on the coast, without direct competition for food. There are 27 species which have been recorded in Afghanistan.

- Eurasian whimbrel, Numenius phaeopus LC
- Far Eastern curlew, Numenius madagascariensis (A) EN
- Eurasian curlew, Numenius arquata NT
- Bar-tailed godwit, Limosa lapponica NT
- Black-tailed godwit, Limosa limosa NT
- Ruddy turnstone, Arenaria interpres LC
- Ruff, Calidris pugnax LC
- Broad-billed sandpiper, Calidris falcinellus (A) LC
- Curlew sandpiper, Calidris ferruginea NT
- Temminck's stint, Calidris temminckii LC
- Sanderling, Calidris alba LC
- Dunlin, Calidris alpina LC
- Little stint, Calidris minuta LC
- Jack snipe, Lymnocryptes minimus LC
- Eurasian woodcock, Scolopax rusticola LC
- Solitary snipe, Gallinago solitaria LC
- Common snipe, Gallinago gallinago LC
- Pin-tailed snipe, Gallinago stenura (A) LC
- Terek sandpiper, Xenus cinereus LC
- Red-necked phalarope, Phalaropus lobatus LC
- Common sandpiper, Actitis hypoleucos LC
- Green sandpiper, Tringa ochropus LC
- Spotted redshank, Tringa erythropus LC
- Common greenshank, Tringa nebularia LC
- Marsh sandpiper, Tringa stagnatilis (A) LC
- Wood sandpiper, Tringa glareola LC
- Common redshank, Tringa totanus LC

== Pratincoles and coursers ==
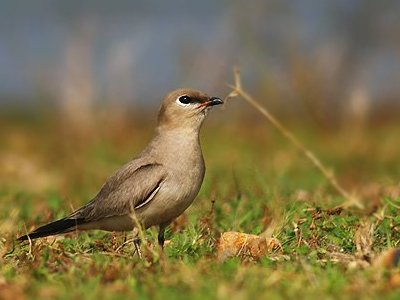
Small pratincole

Order: Charadriiformes Family: Glareolidae

Glareolidae is a family of wading birds comprising the pratincoles, which have short legs, long pointed wings and long forked tails, and the coursers, which have long legs, short wings and long, pointed bills which curve downwards.

- Cream-colored courser, Cursorius cursor LC
- Collared pratincole, Glareola pratincola (A) LC
- Small pratincole, Glareola lactea (A) LC

== Gulls, terns, and skimmers ==
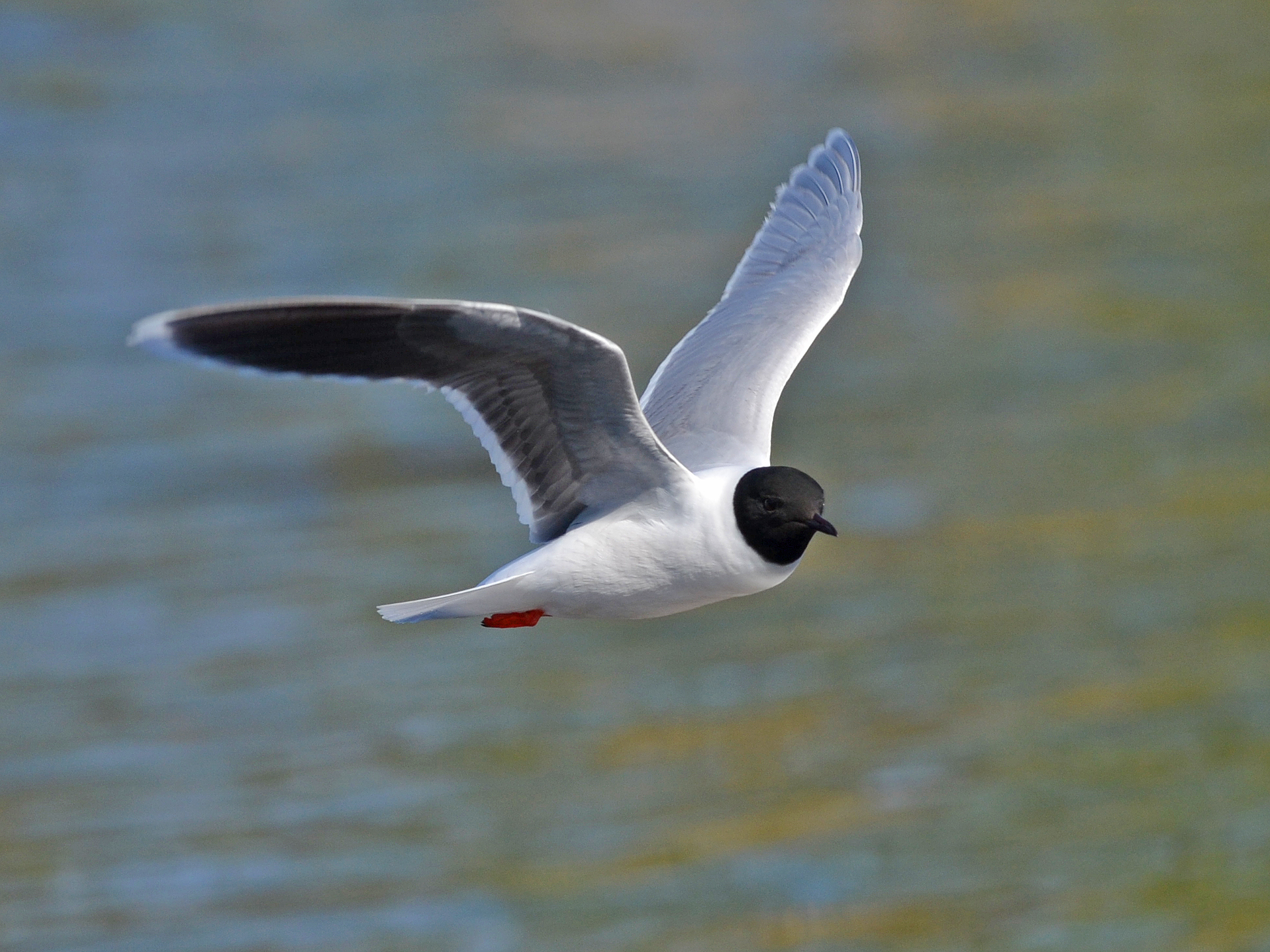
Little gull in breeding plumage

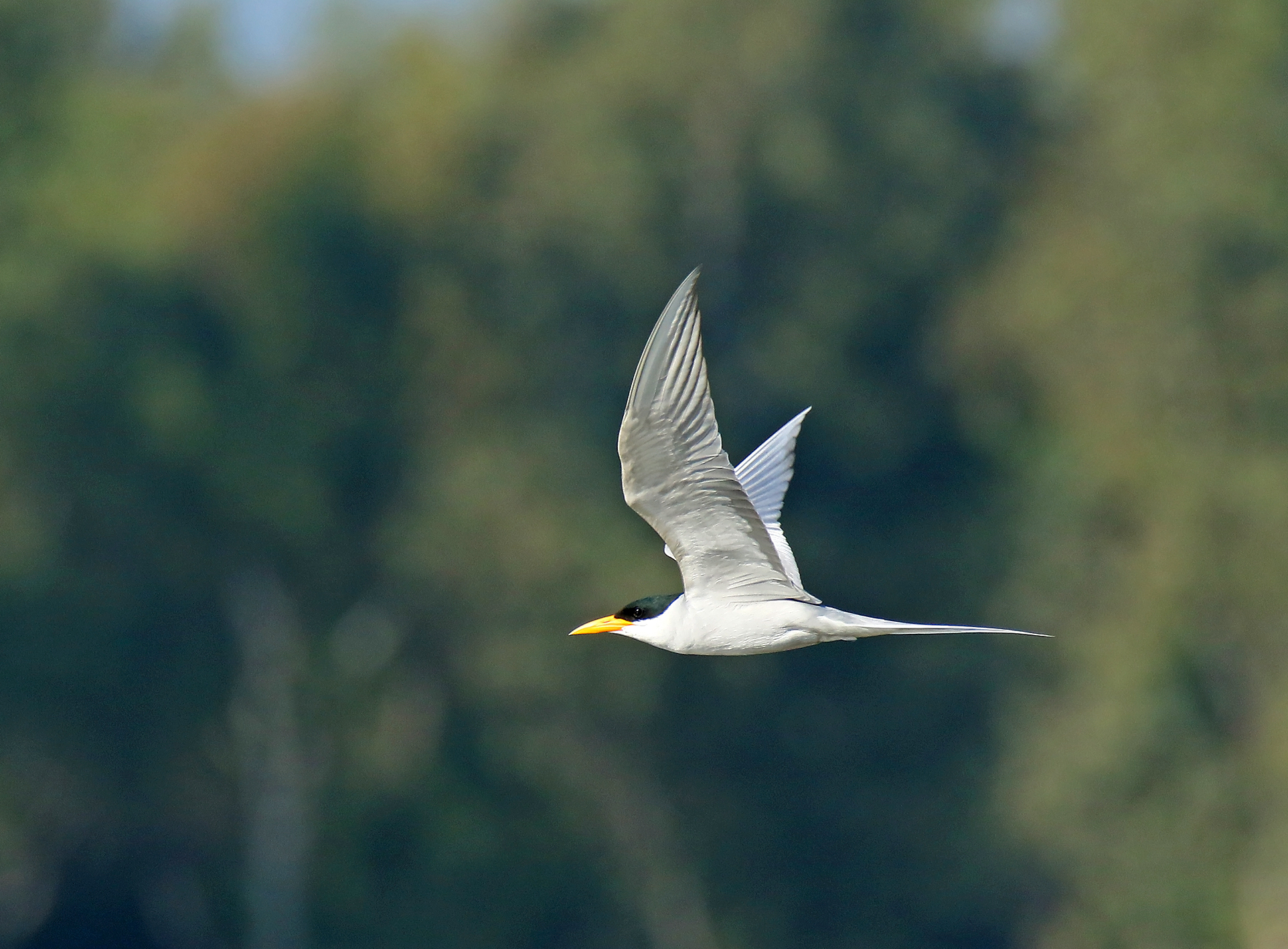
A river tern in flight

Order: Charadriiformes Family: Laridae

Laridae is a family of medium to large seabirds, the gulls, terns, and skimmers. Gulls are typically grey or white, often with black markings on the head or wings. They have stout, longish bills and webbed feet. Terns are a group of generally medium to large seabirds typically with grey or white plumage, often with black markings on the head. Most terns hunt fish by diving but some pick insects off the surface of fresh water. Terns are generally long-lived birds, with several species known to live in excess of 30 years.

- Slender-billed gull, Chroicocephalus genei LC
- Black-headed gull, Chroicocephalus ridibundus LC
- Brown-headed gull, Chroicocephalus brunnicephalus (A) LC
- Little gull, Hydrocoloeus minutus (A) LC
- Pallas's gull, Ichthyaetus ichthyaetus LC
- Common gull, Larus canus (A) LC
- Lesser black-backed gull, Larus fuscus LC
- Little tern, Sternula albifrons LC
- Gull-billed tern, Gelochelidon nilotica LC
- Caspian tern, Hydroprogne caspia LC
- Black tern, Chlidonias niger (A) LC
- White-winged tern, Chlidonias leucopterus LC
- Whiskered tern, Chlidonias hybrida (A) LC
- Common tern, Sterna hirundo LC
- River tern, Sterna aurantia (A) VU

== Storks ==
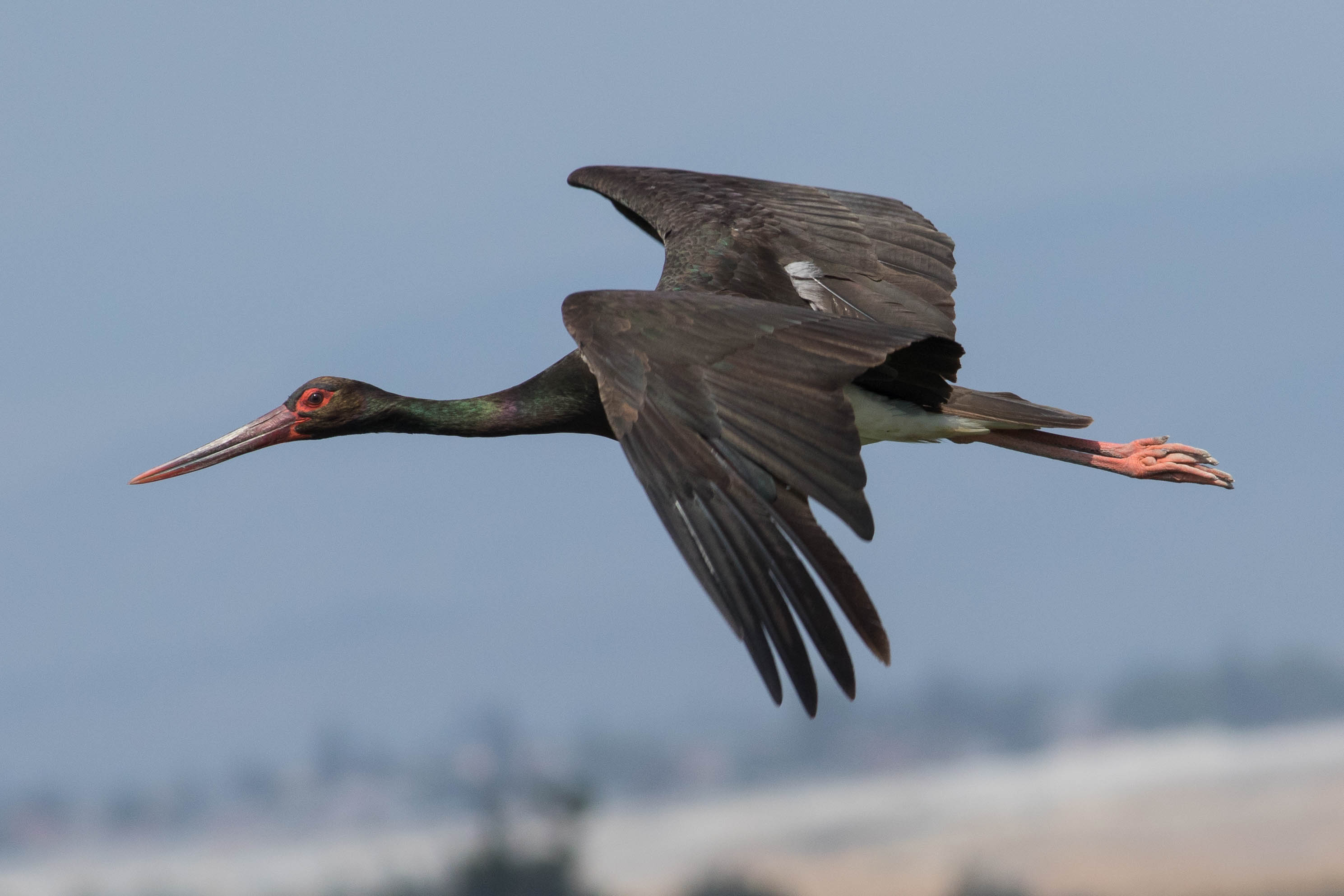
Black stork in flight

Order: Ciconiiformes Family: Ciconiidae

Storks are large, long-legged, long-necked, wading birds with long, stout bills. Storks are mute, but bill-clattering is an important mode of communication at the nest. Their nests can be large and may be reused for many years. Many species are migratory.

- Black stork, Ciconia nigra LC
- White stork, Ciconia ciconia LC

== Cormorants and shags ==
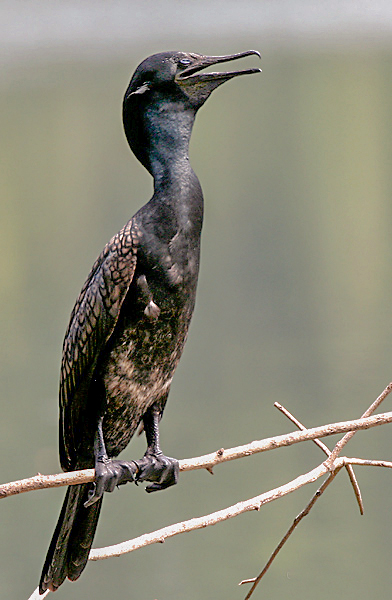
Indian cormorant

Order: Suliformes Family: Phalacrocoracidae

Phalacrocoracidae is a family of medium to large coastal, fish-eating seabirds that includes cormorants and shags. Plumage colouration varies, with the majority having mainly dark plumage, some species being black-and-white and a few being colourful.

- Little cormorant, Microcarbo niger (A) LC
- Pygmy cormorant, Microcarbo pygmeus LC
- Great cormorant, Phalacrocorax carbo LC
- Indian cormorant, Phalacrocorax fuscicollis (A) LC

== Pelicans ==
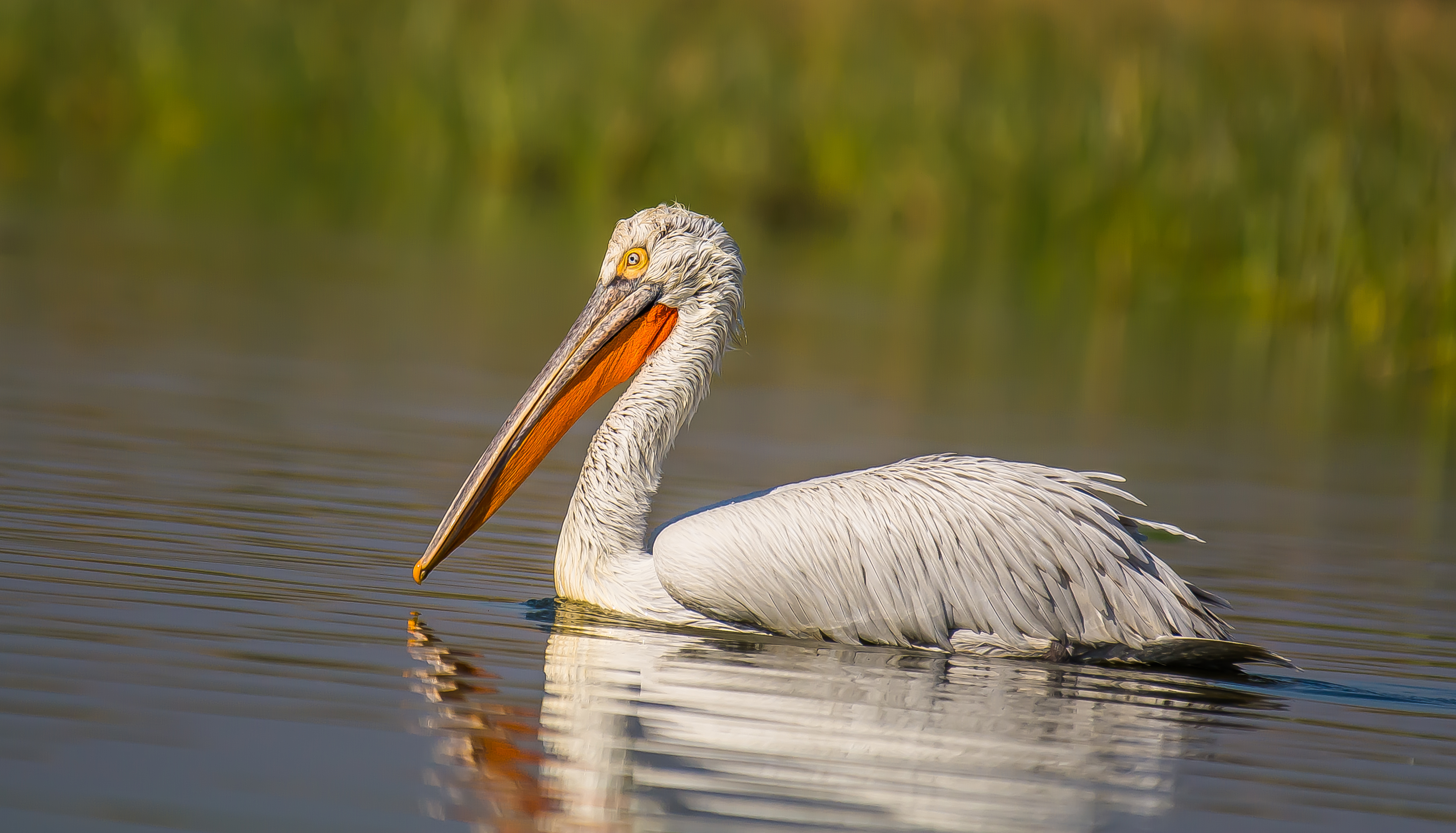
Dalmatian pelican

Order: Pelecaniformes Family: Pelecanidae

Pelicans are large water birds with a distinctive pouch under their beak. As with other members of the order Pelecaniformes, they have webbed feet with four toes.

- Great white pelican, Pelecanus onocrotalus LC
- Dalmatian pelican, Pelecanus crispus NT

== Herons, egrets, and bitterns ==
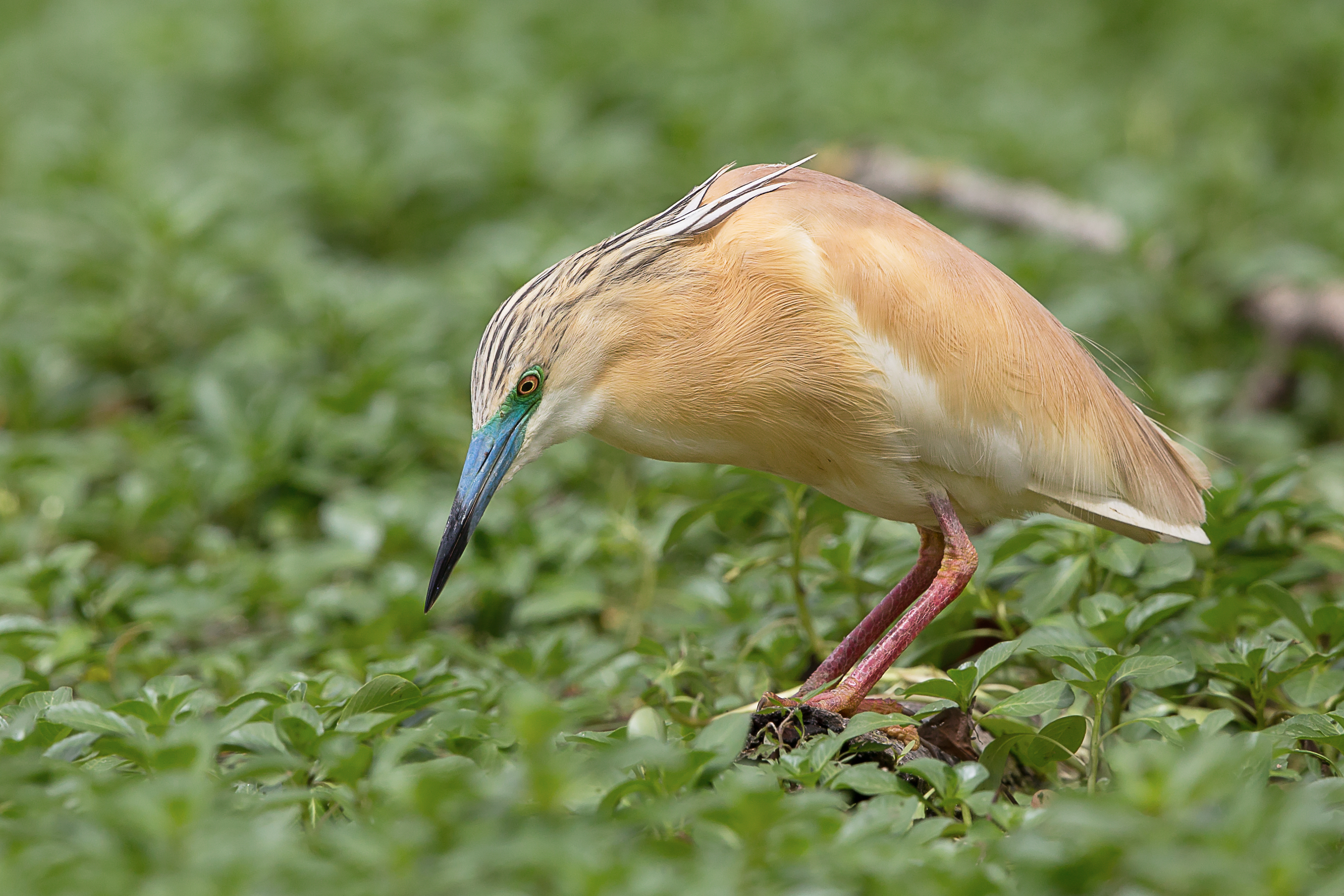
A hunting squacco heron

Order: Pelecaniformes Family: Ardeidae

The family Ardeidae contains the bitterns, herons and egrets. Herons and egrets are medium to large wading birds with long necks and legs. Bitterns tend to be shorter necked and more wary. Members of Ardeidae fly with their necks retracted, unlike other long-necked birds such as storks, ibises and spoonbills.

- Eurasian bittern, Botaurus stellaris LC
- Little bittern, Ixobrychus minutus LC
- Cinnamon bittern, Ixobrychus cinnamomeus (A) LC
- Gray heron, Ardea cinerea LC
- Purple heron, Ardea purpurea LC
- Great egret, Ardea alba LC
- Little egret, Egretta garzetta (A) LC
- Cattle egret, Bubulcus ibis (A) LC
- Squacco heron, Ardeola ralloides (A)' LC
- Black-crowned night-heron, Nycticorax nycticorax LC

== Ibises and spoonbills ==
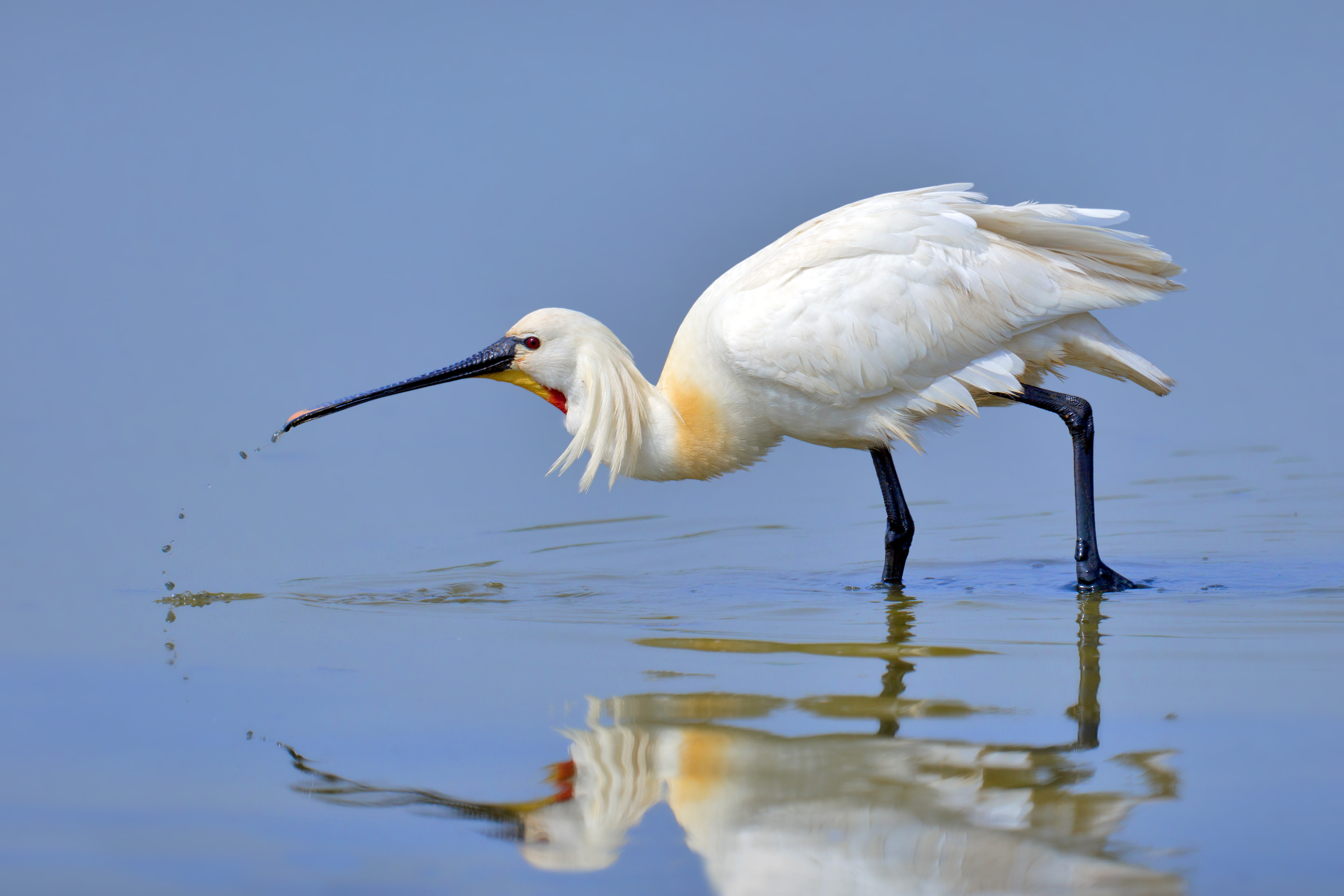
Eurasian spoonbill

Order: Pelecaniformes Family: Threskiornithidae

Threskiornithidae is a family of large terrestrial and wading birds which includes the ibises and spoonbills. They have long, broad wings with 11 primary and about 20 secondary feathers. They are strong fliers and despite their size and weight, very capable soarers.

- Glossy ibis, Plegadis falcinellus LC
- Eurasian spoonbill, Platalea leucorodia LC

== Osprey ==
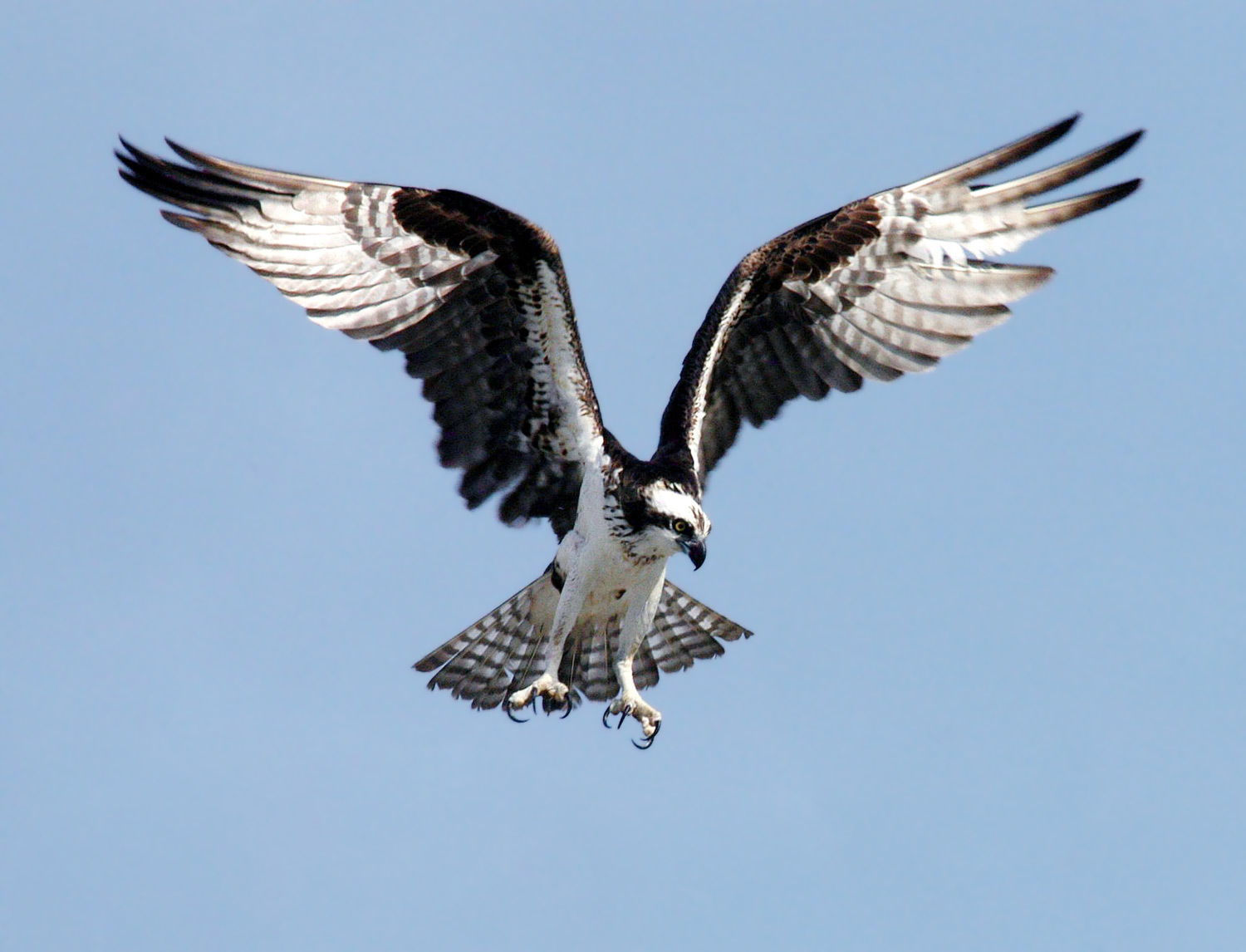
A hunting osprey

Order: Accipitriformes Family: Pandionidae

The family Pandionidae contains only one species, the osprey. The osprey is a medium-large raptor which is a specialist fish-eater with a worldwide distribution.

- Osprey, Pandion haliaetus LC

== Hawks, eagles, and kites ==
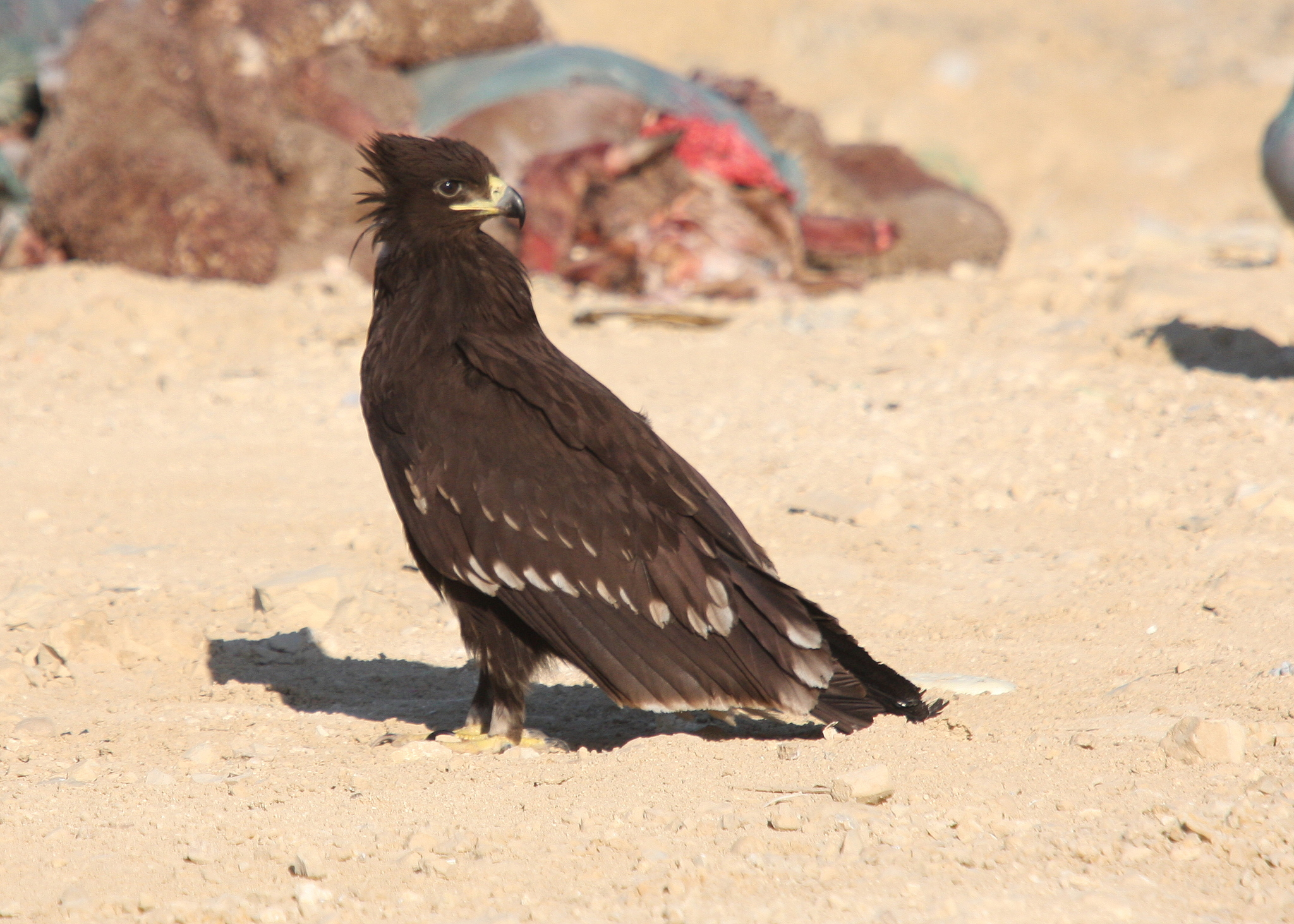
Greater spotted eagle

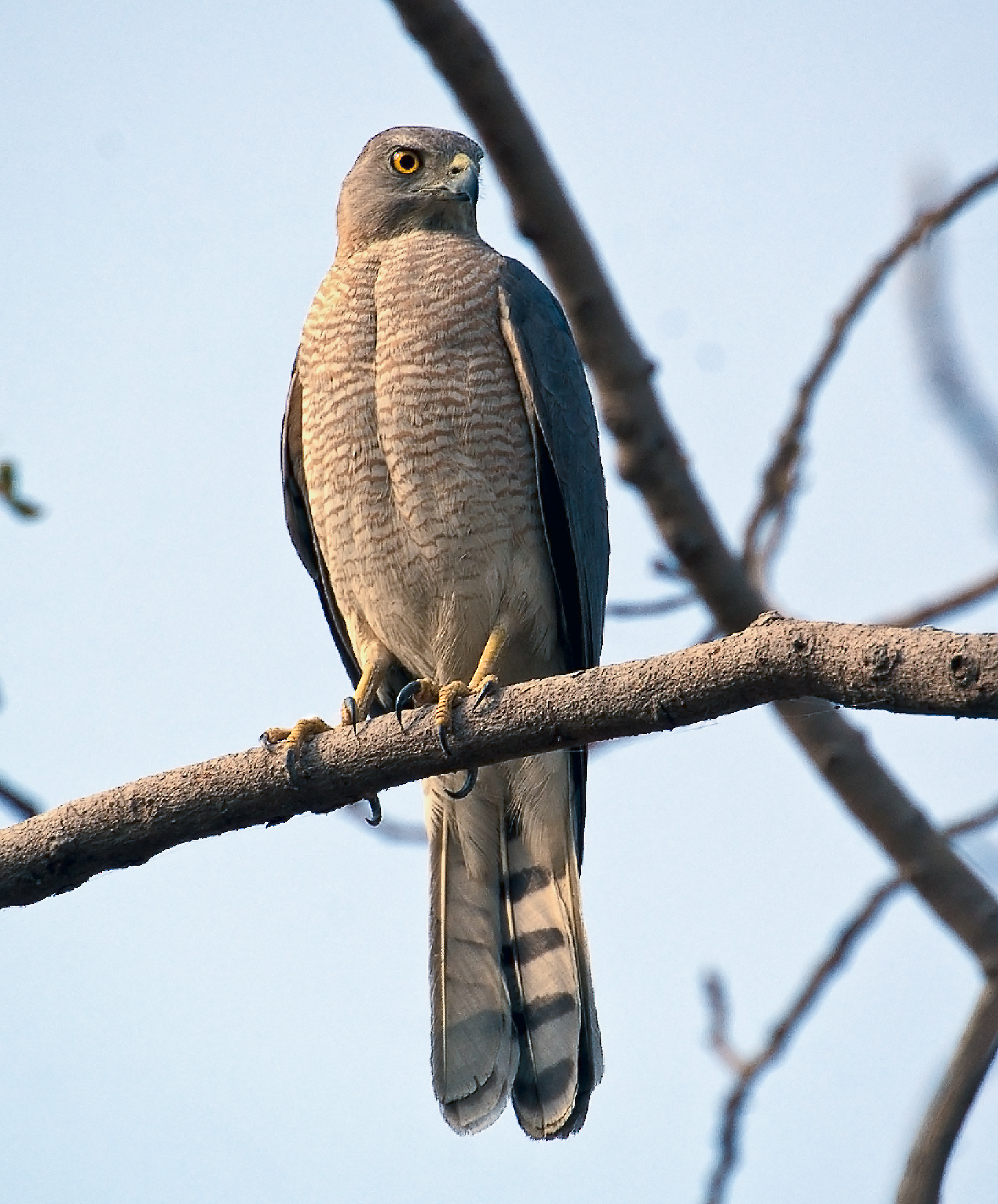
Shikra

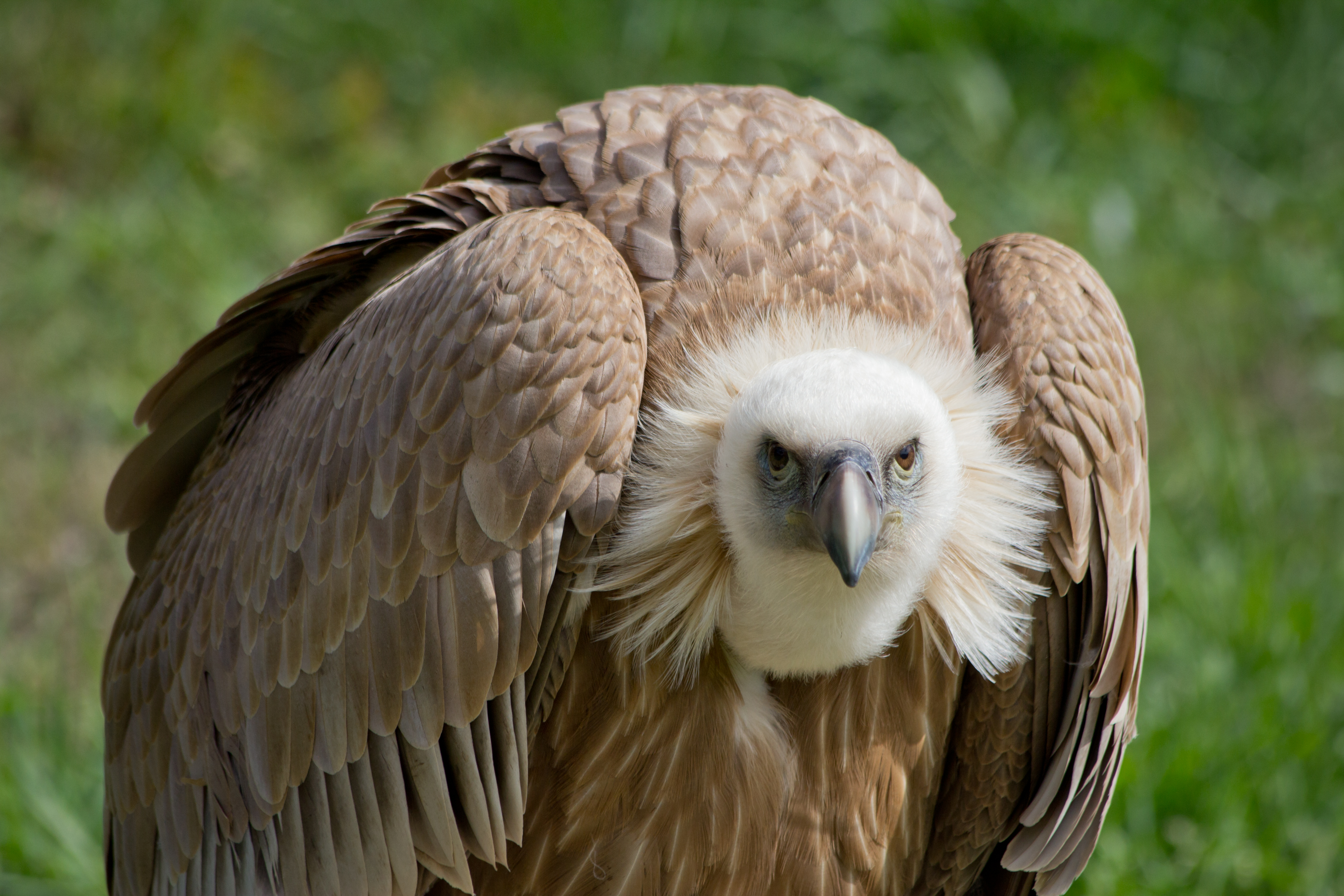
Eurasian griffon

Order: Accipitriformes Family: Accipitridae

Accipitridae is a family of birds of prey, which includes hawks, eagles, kites, harriers and Old World vultures. These birds have powerful hooked beaks for tearing flesh from their prey, strong legs, powerful talons and keen eyesight.

- Black-winged kite, Elanus caeruleus LC
- Bearded vulture, Gypaetus barbatus NT
- Egyptian vulture, Neophron percnopterus EN
- European honey-buzzard, Pernis apivorus (A) LC
- Crested honey-buzzard, Pernis ptilorhynchus LC
- Cinereous vulture, Aegypius monachus NT
- White-rumped vulture, Gyps bengalensis (A) CR
- Himalayan griffon, Gyps himalayensis NT
- Eurasian griffon vulture, Gyps fulvus LC
- Short-toed snake-eagle, Circaetus gallicus LC
- Greater spotted eagle, Clanga clanga VU
- Booted eagle, Hieraaetus pennatus LC
- Tawny eagle, Aquila rapax (A) VU
- Steppe eagle, Aquila nipalensis EN
- Eastern imperial eagle, Aquila heliaca VU
- Golden eagle, Aquila chrysaetos LC
- Bonelli's eagle, Aquila fasciata (A) LC
- White-eyed buzzard, Butastur teesa (A) LC
- Western marsh-harrier, Circus aeruginosus LC
- Hen harrier, Circus cyaneus LC
- Pallid harrier, Circus macrourus NT
- Montagu's harrier, Circus pygargus LC
- Shikra, Accipiter badius LC
- Levant sparrowhawk, Accipiter brevipes (A) LC
- Eurasian sparrowhawk, Accipiter nisus LC
- Eurasian goshawk, Accipiter gentilis LC
- Black kite, Milvus migrans LC
- White-tailed eagle, Haliaeetus albicilla LC
- Pallas's fish eagle, Haliaeetus leucoryphus EN
- Rough-legged hawk, Buteo lagopus LC
- Common buzzard, Buteo buteo LC
- Long-legged buzzard, Buteo rufinus LC

== Barn-owls ==
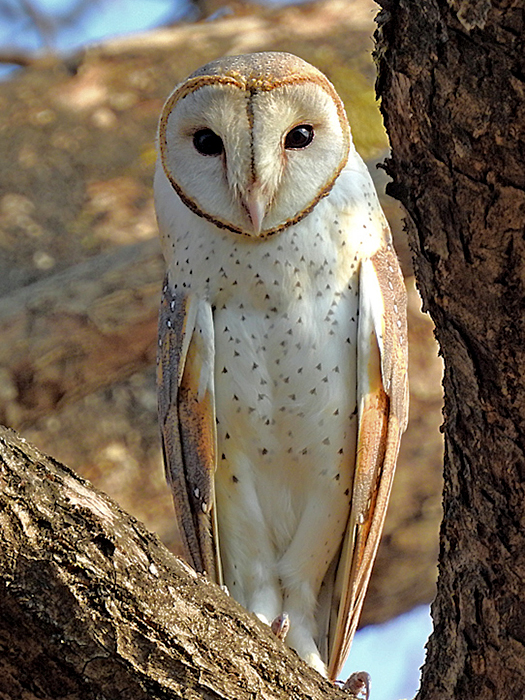
Eastern barn owl

Order: Strigiformes Family: Tytonidae

Barn owls are medium to large owls with large heads and characteristic heart-shaped faces. They have long strong legs with powerful talons.

- Eastern barn owl, Tyto javanica (A) LC

== Owls ==
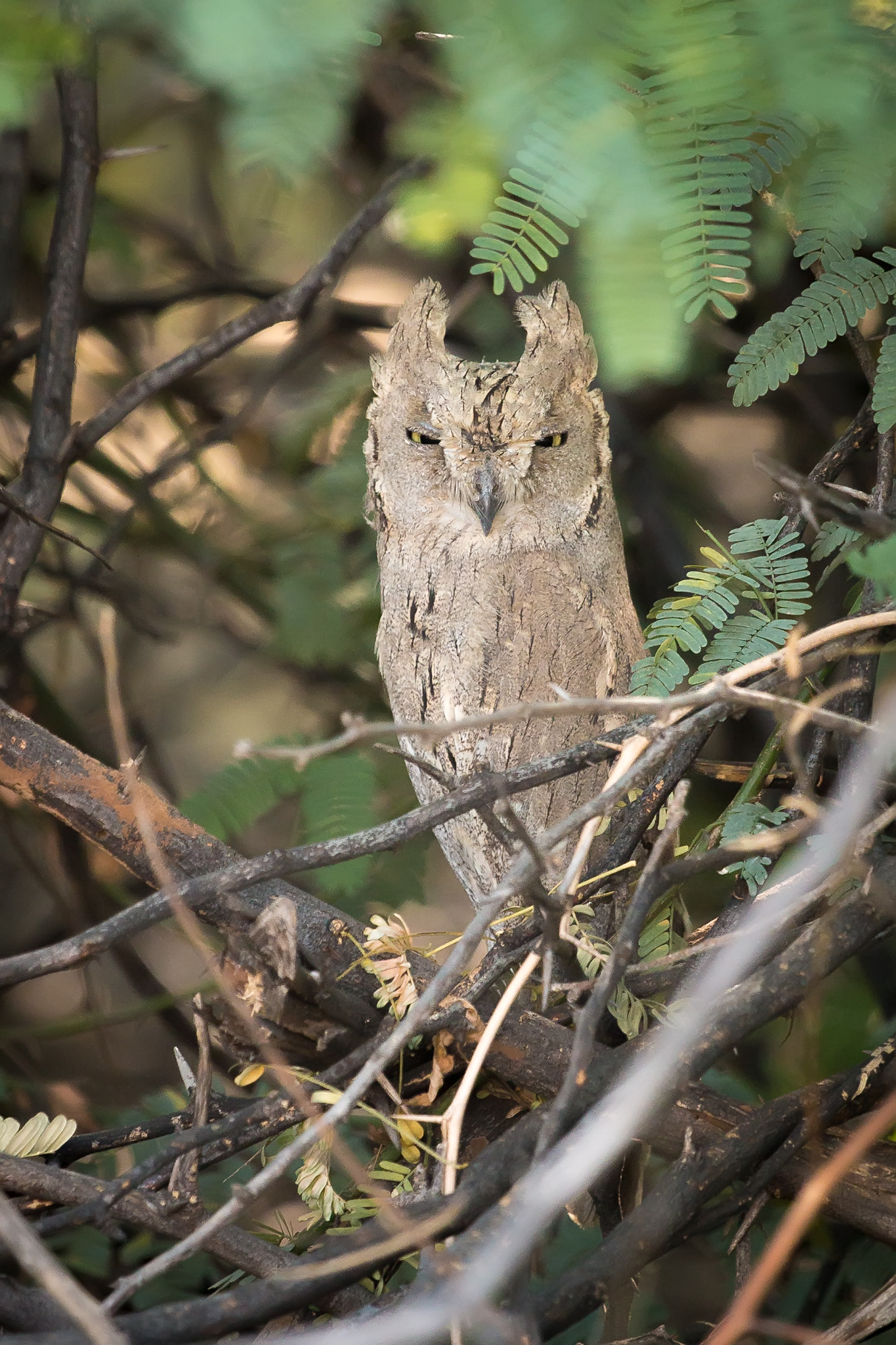
Pallid scops-owl

Order: Strigiformes Family: Strigidae

The typical owls are small to large solitary nocturnal birds of prey. They have large forward-facing eyes and ears, a hawk-like beak and a conspicuous circle of feathers around each eye called a facial disk.

- Indian scops-owl, Otus bakkamoena LC
- Eurasian scops owl, Otus scops LC
- Pallid scops owl, Otus brucei (A) LC
- Eurasian eagle owl, Bubo bubo LC
- Collared owlet, Taenioptynx brodiei LC
- Little owl, Athene noctua LC
- Tawny owl, Strix aluco LC
- Long-eared owl, Asio otus LC
- Short-eared owl, Asio flammeus LC
- Boreal owl, Aegolius funereus (A) LC

== Hoopoes ==
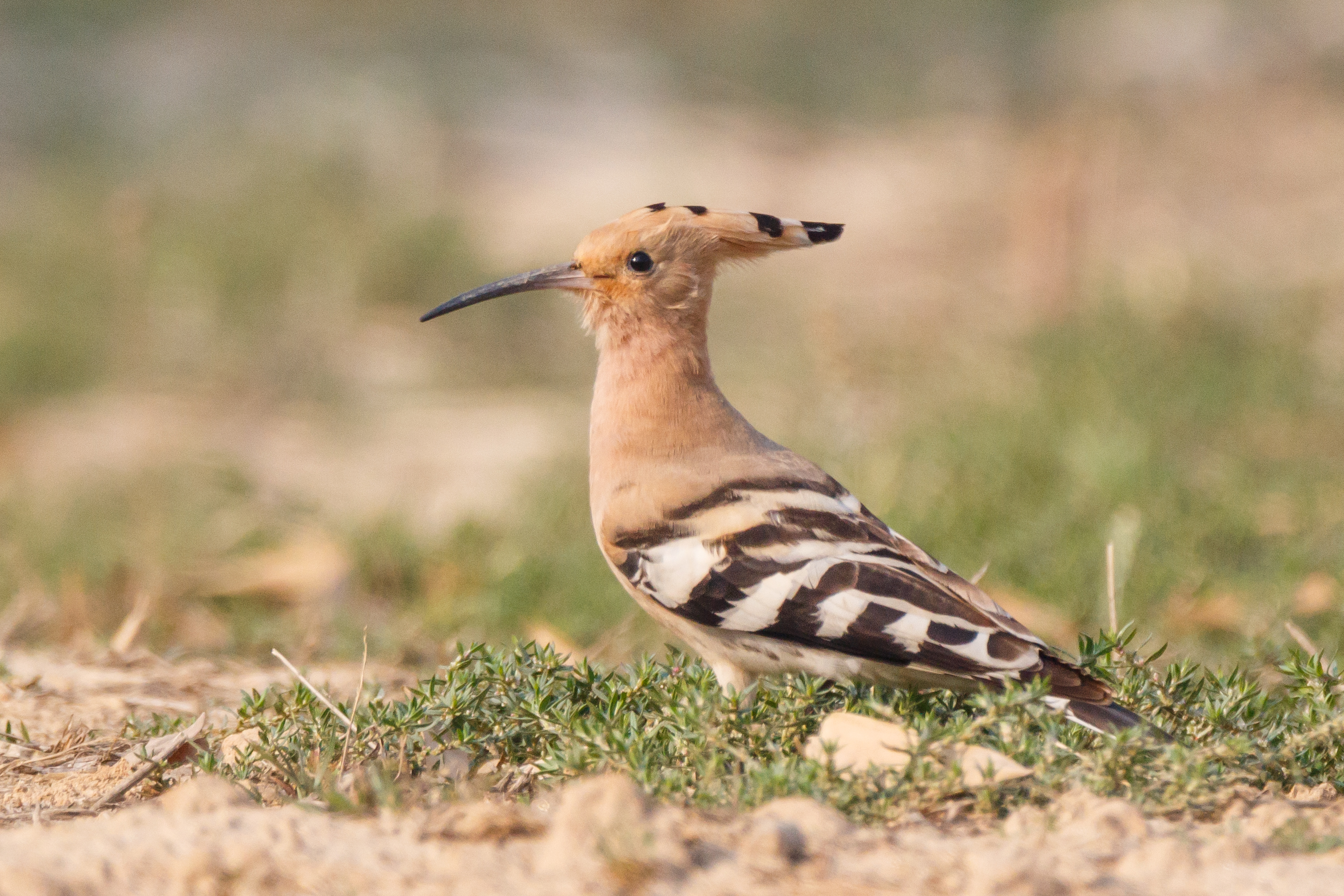
Eurasian hoopoe

Order: Bucerotiformes Family: Upupidae

Hoopoes have black, white and orangey-pink colouring with a large erectile crest on their head.

- Eurasian hoopoe, Upupa epops LC

== Kingfishers ==
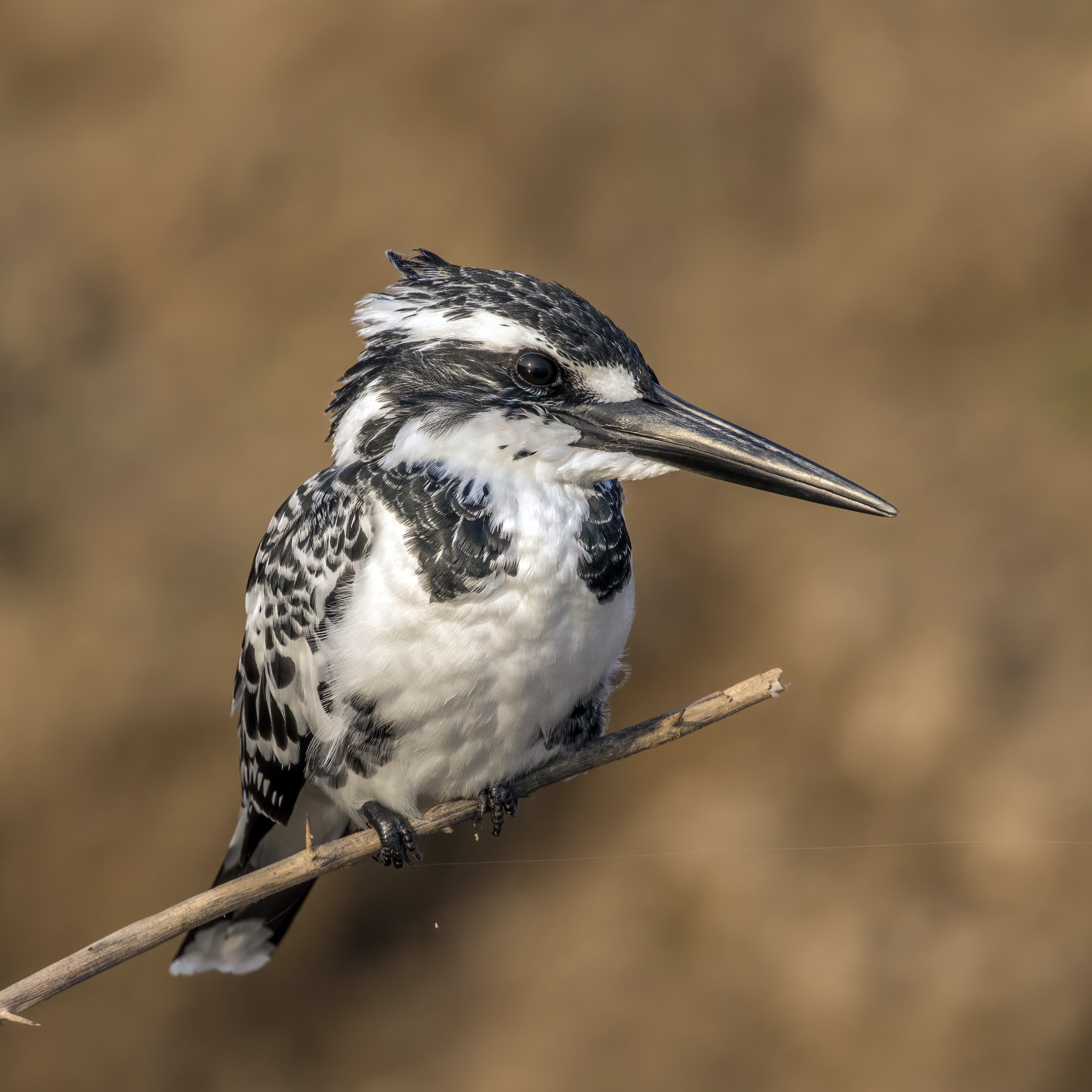
A female pied kingfisher

Order: Coraciiformes Family: Alcedinidae

Kingfishers are medium-sized birds with large heads, long, pointed bills, short legs and stubby tails.

- Common kingfisher, Alcedo atthis LC
- White-throated kingfisher, Halcyon smyrnensis LC
- Crested kingfisher, Megaceryle lugubris LC
- Pied kingfisher, Ceryle rudis LC

== Bee-eaters ==
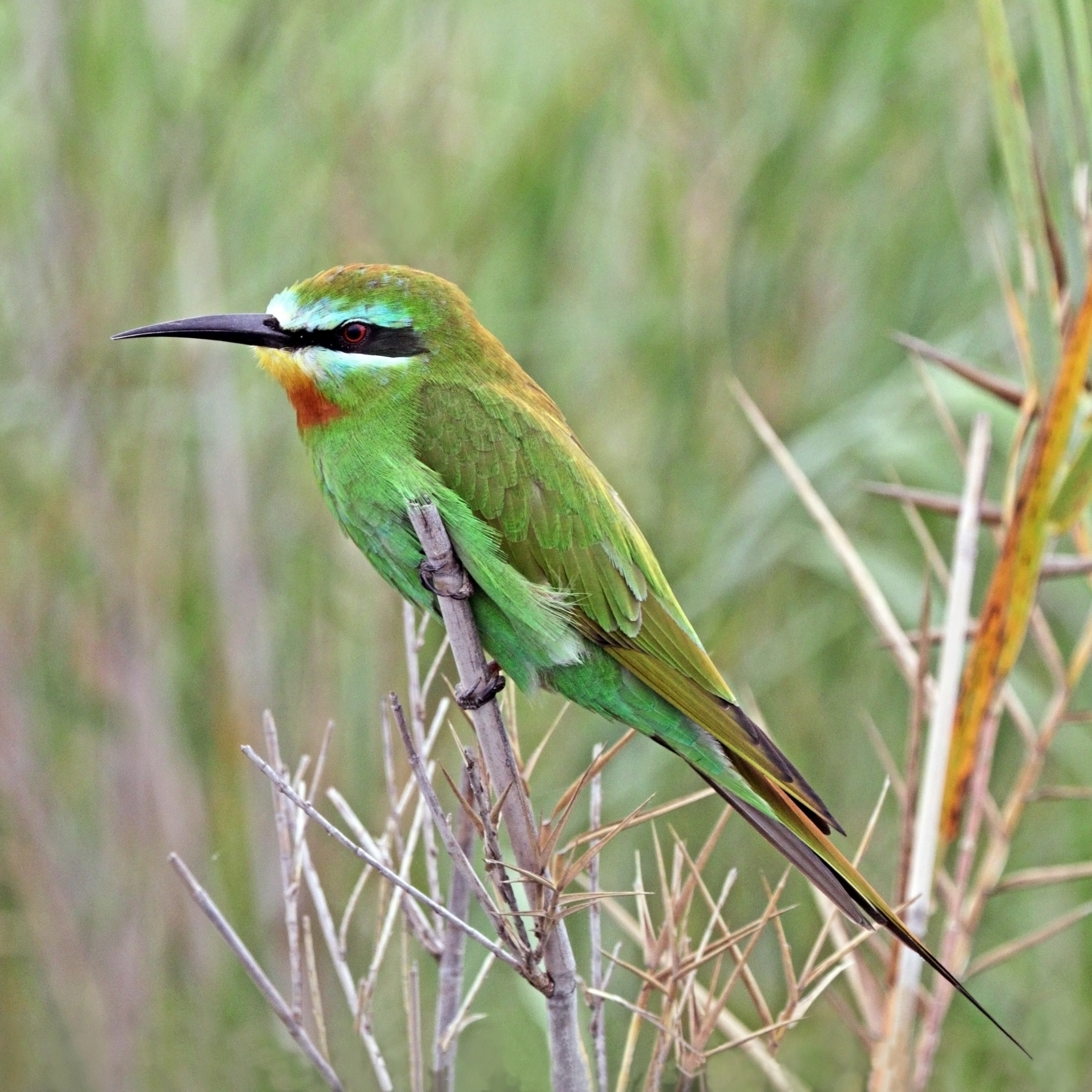
Blue-cheeked bee-eater

Order: Coraciiformes Family: Meropidae

The bee-eaters are a group of near passerine birds in the family Meropidae. Most species are found in Africa but others occur in southern Europe, Madagascar, Australia and New Guinea. They are characterised by richly coloured plumage, slender bodies and usually elongated central tail feathers. All are colourful and have long downturned bills and pointed wings, which give them a swallow-like appearance when seen from afar.

- Asian green bee-eater, Merops orientalis (A) LC
- Blue-cheeked bee-eater, Merops persicus LC
- European bee-eater, Merops apiaster LC

== Rollers ==
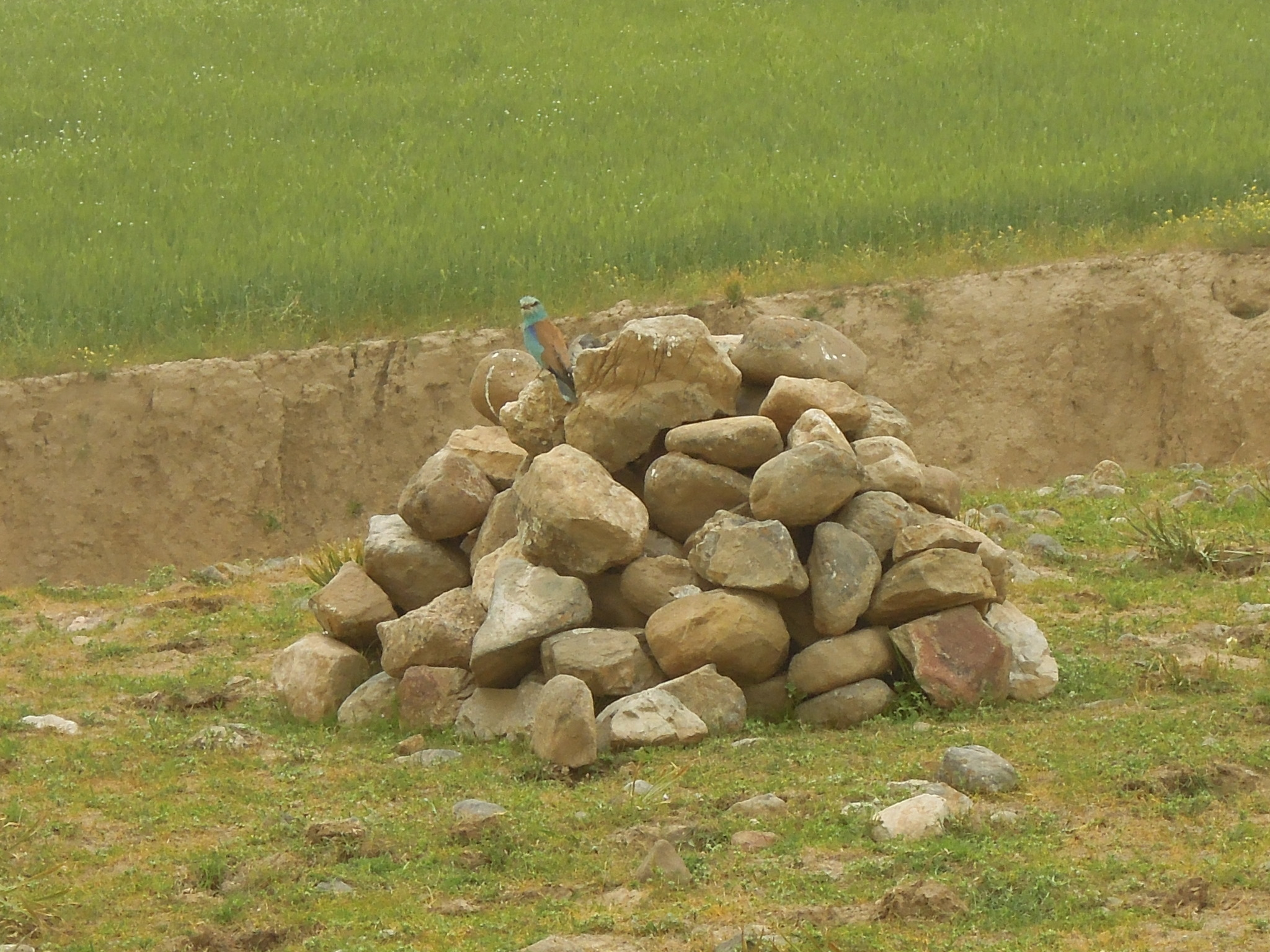
European roller in Chal District

Order: Coraciiformes Family: Coraciidae

Rollers resemble crows in size and build, but are more closely related to the kingfishers and bee-eaters. They share the colourful appearance of those groups with blues and browns predominating. The two inner front toes are connected, but the outer toe is not.

- European roller, Coracias garrulus LC
- Indian roller, Coracias benghalensis LC

== Woodpeckers ==
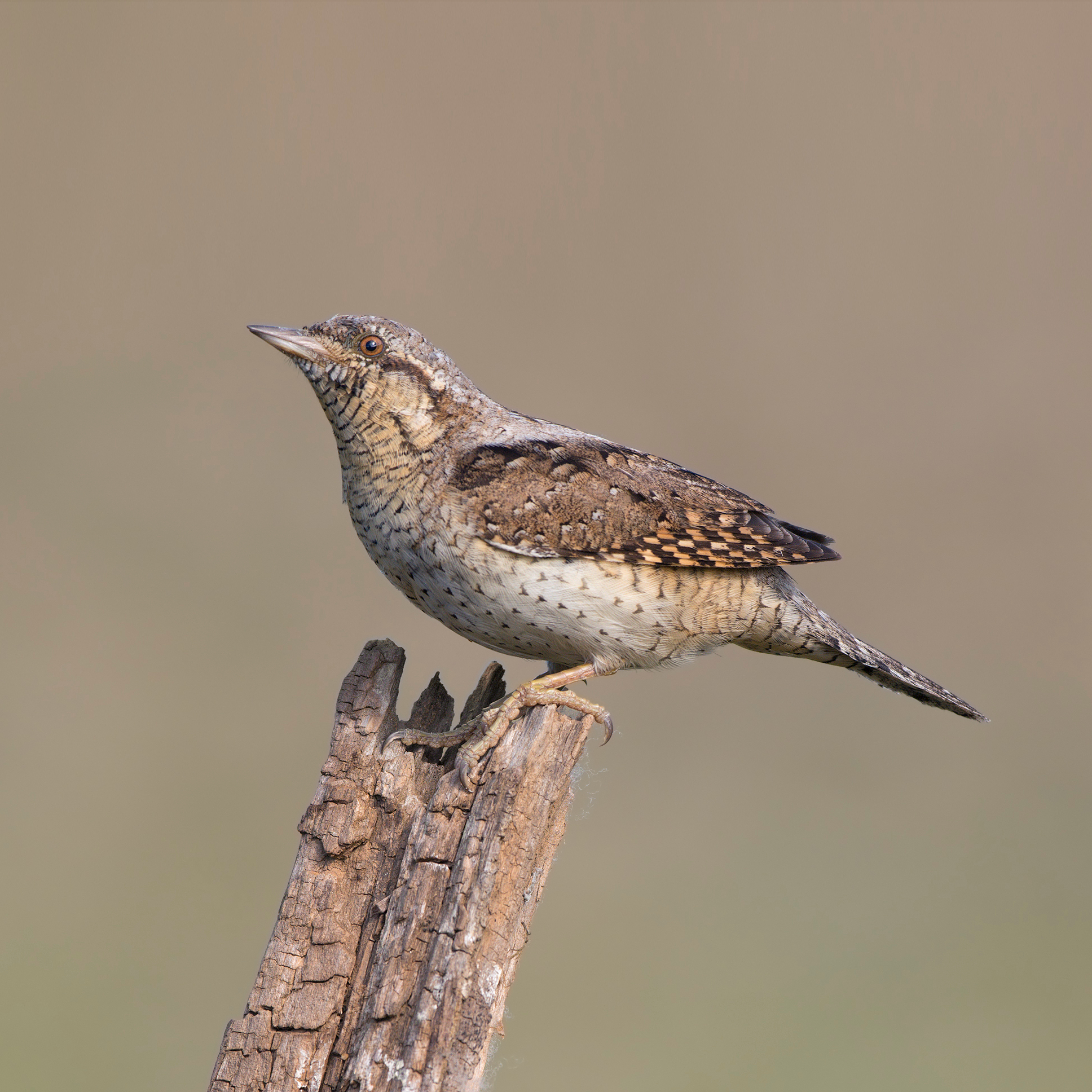
Eurasian wryneck

Order: Piciformes Family: Picidae

Woodpeckers are small to medium-sized birds with chisel-like beaks, short legs, stiff tails and long tongues used for capturing insects. Some species have feet with two toes pointing forward and two backward, while several species have only three toes. Many woodpeckers have the habit of tapping noisily on tree trunks with their beaks.

- Eurasian wryneck, Jynx torquilla LC
- Speckled piculet, Picumnus innominatus LC
- Brown-fronted woodpecker, Dendrocoptes auriceps LC
- White-winged woodpecker, Dendrocopos leucopterus LC
- Himalayan woodpecker, Dendrocopos himalayensis LC
- Scaly-bellied woodpecker, Picus squamatus LC

== Falcons and caracaras ==
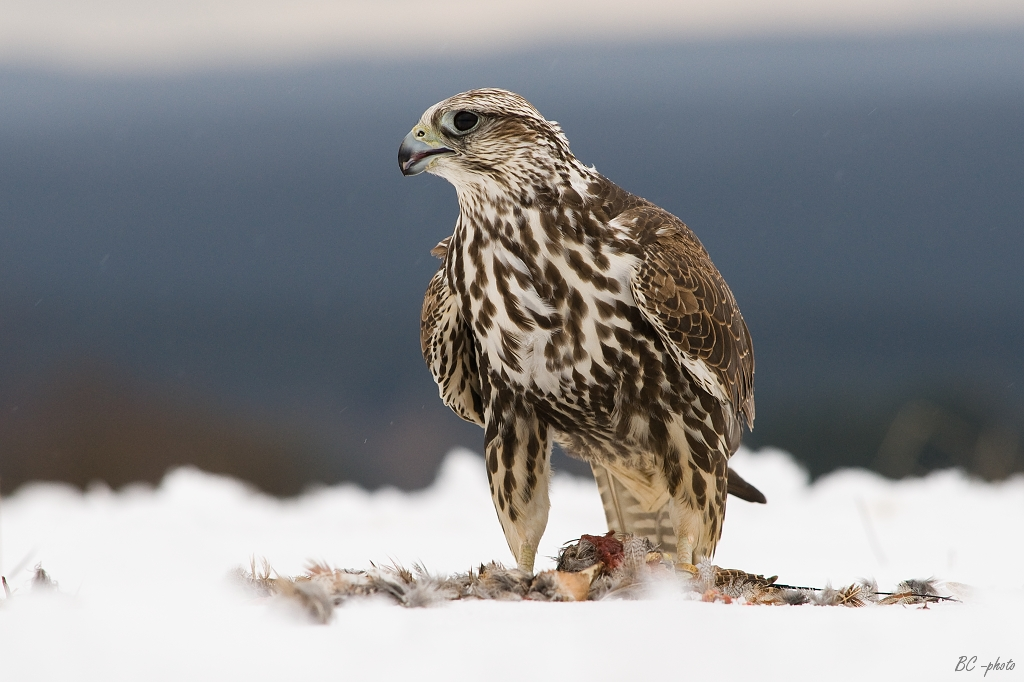
Saker falcon

Order: Falconiformes Family: Falconidae

Falconidae is a family of diurnal birds of prey. They differ from hawks, eagles and kites in that they kill with their beaks instead of their talons.

- Lesser kestrel, Falco naumanni LC
- Common kestrel, Falco tinnunculus LC
- Red-footed falcon, Falco vespertinus VU
- Merlin, Falco columbarius LC
- Eurasian hobby, Falco subbuteo LC
- Laggar falcon, Falco jugger NT
- Saker falcon, Falco cherrug EN
- Gyrfalcon, Falco rusticolus (A) LC
- Peregrine falcon, Falco peregrinus LC

== Old World parrots ==
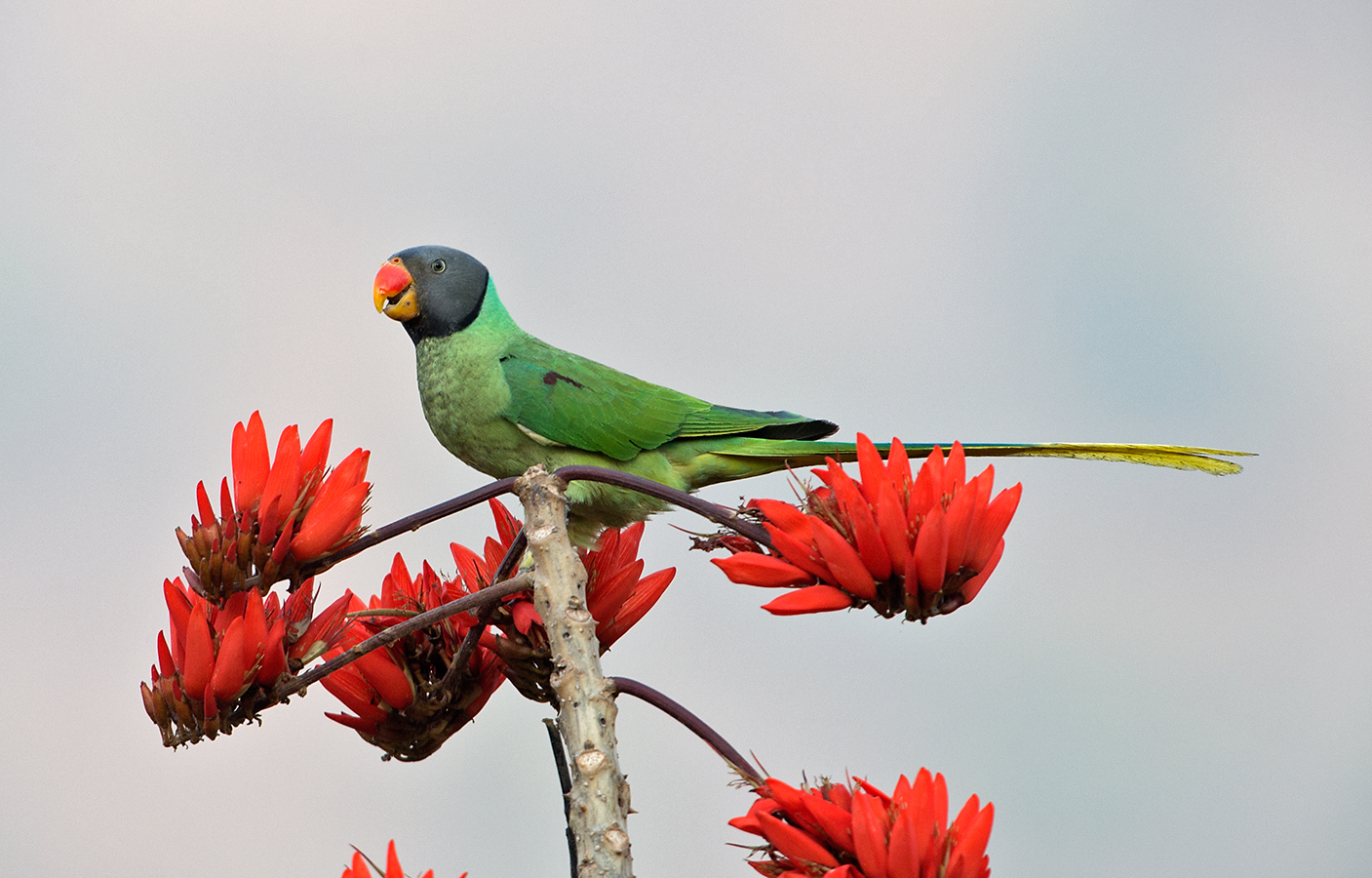
Slaty-headed parakeet

Order: Psittaciformes Family: Psittaculidae

Old World parrots are small to large birds with a characteristic curved beak. Their upper mandibles have slight mobility in the joint with the skull and they have a generally erect stance. All parrots are zygodactyl, having the four toes on each foot placed two at the front and two to the back.

- Alexandrine parakeet, Psittacula eupatria (A) NT
- Rose-ringed parakeet, Psittacula krameri (I) LC
- Slaty-headed parakeet, Psittacula himalayana LC

== Cuckooshrikes ==
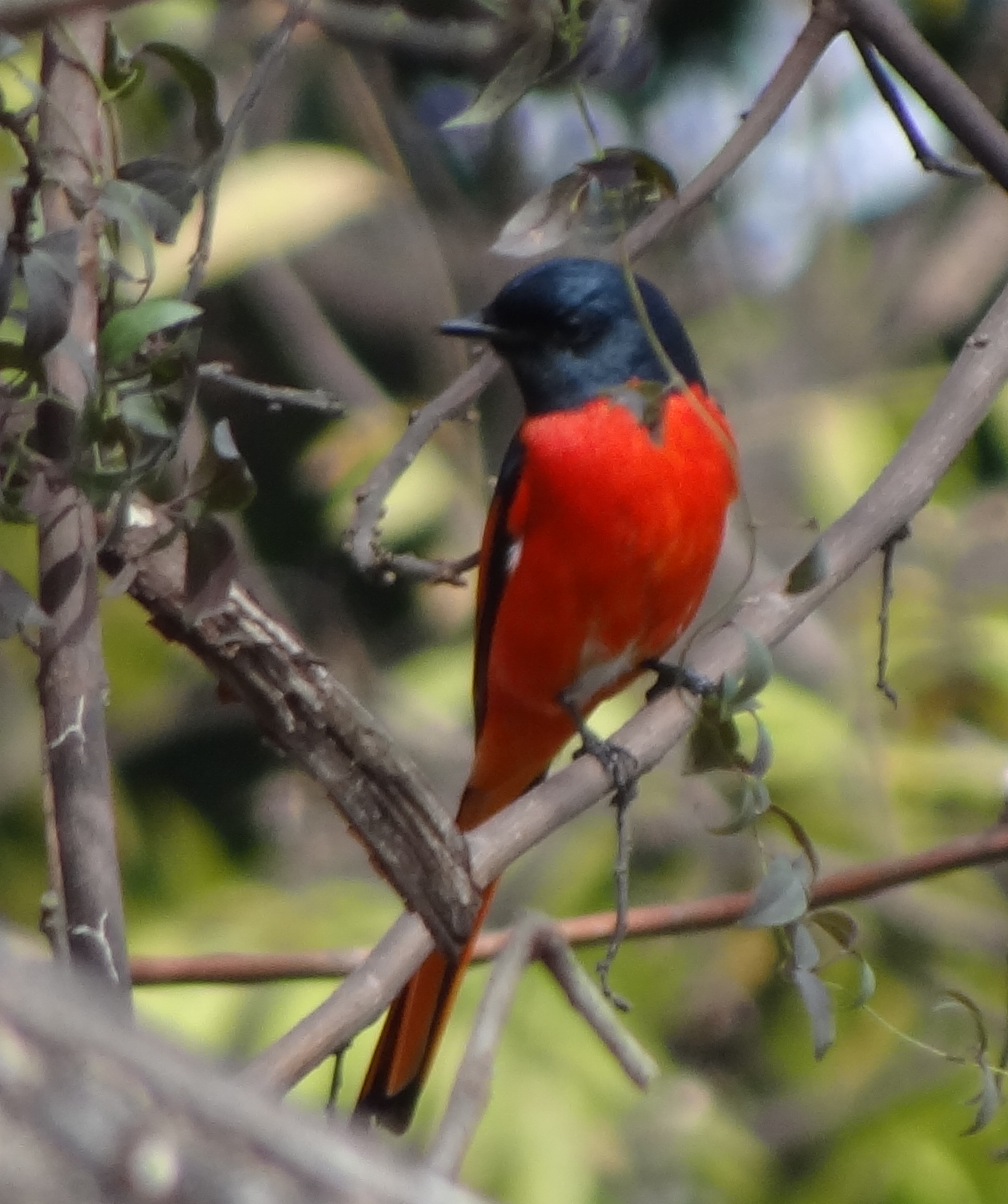
Long-tailed minivet

Order: Passeriformes Family: Campephagidae

The cuckooshrikes are small to medium-sized passerine birds. They are predominantly greyish with white and black, although some species are brightly coloured.

- Long-tailed minivet, Pericrocotus ethologus LC
- Rosy minivet, Pericrocotus roseus (A) LC

== Old World orioles ==
Order: Passeriformes Family: Oriolidae

The Old World orioles are colourful passerine birds. They are not related to the New World orioles.

- Eurasian golden oriole, Oriolus oriolus LC
- Indian golden oriole, Oriolus kundoo LC

== Drongos ==
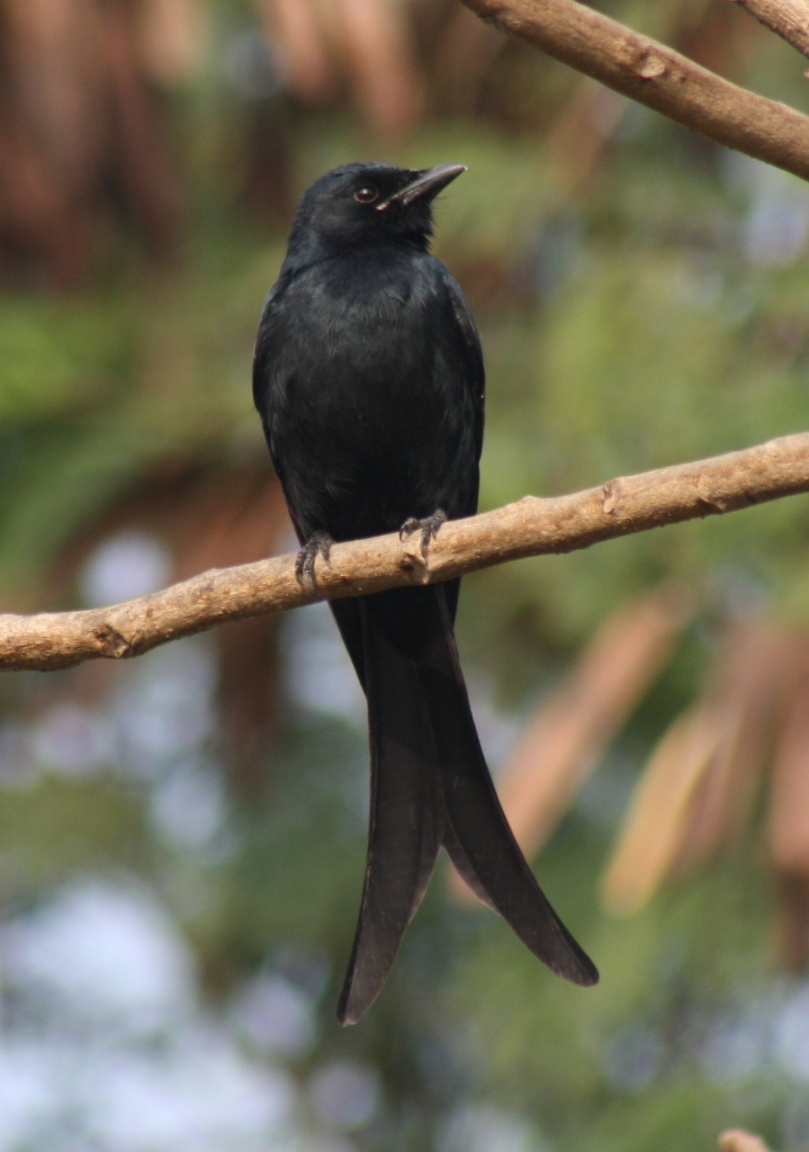
Black drongo

Order: Passeriformes Family: Dicruridae

The drongos are mostly black or dark grey in colour, sometimes with metallic tints. They have long forked tails, and some Asian species have elaborate tail decorations. They have short legs and sit very upright when perched, like a shrike. They flycatch or take prey from the ground.

- Black drongo, Dicrurus macrocercus LC
- Ashy drongo, Dicrurus leucophaeus LC

== Monarch flycatchers ==
Order: Passeriformes Family: Monarchidae

The monarch flycatchers are small to medium-sized insectivorous passerines which hunt by flycatching.

- Indian paradise flycatcher, Terpsiphone paradisi LC

== Shrikes ==
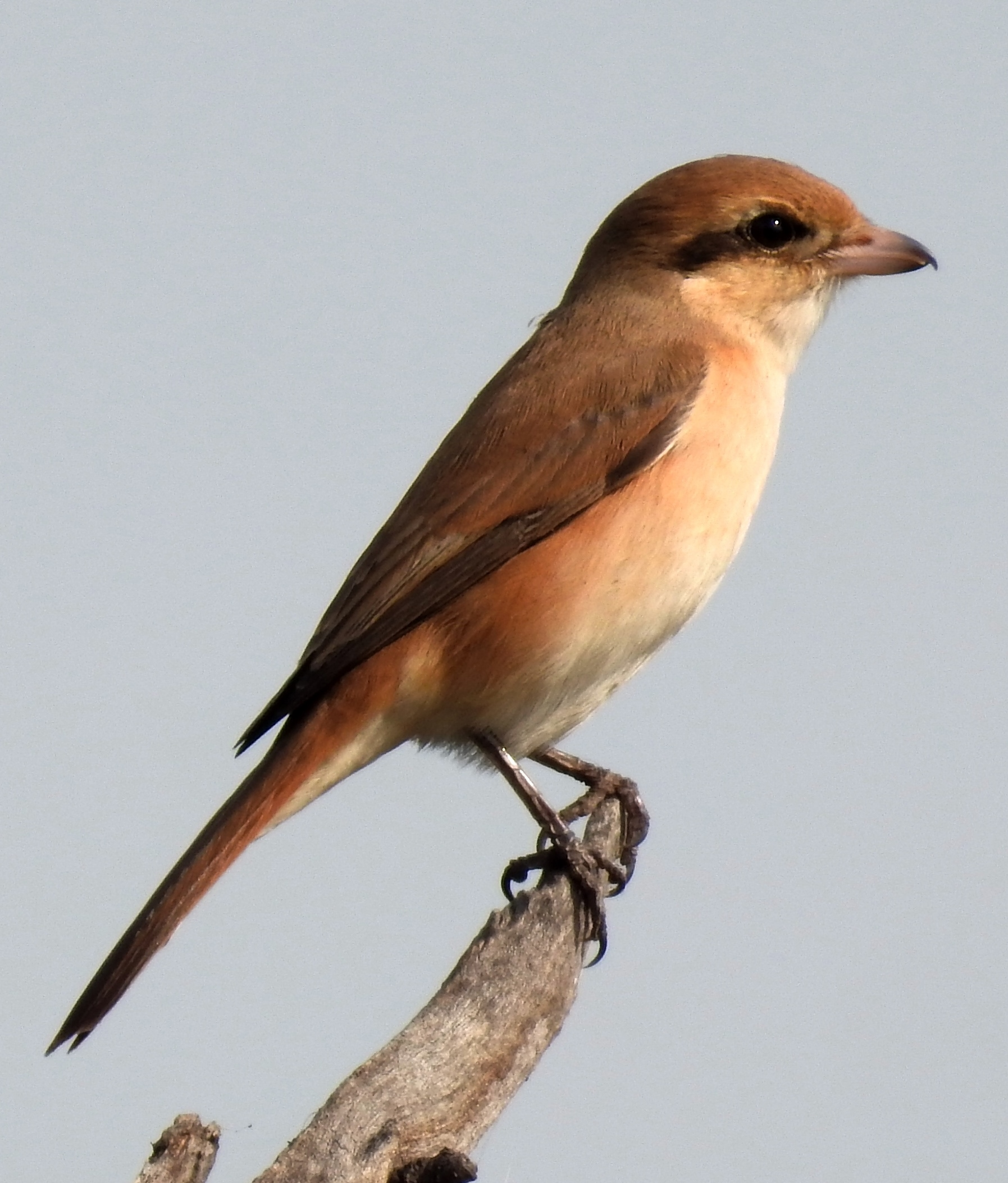
Isabelling shrike

Order: Passeriformes Family: Laniidae

Shrikes are passerine birds known for their habit of catching other birds and small animals and impaling the uneaten portions of their bodies on thorns. A typical shrike's beak is hooked, like a bird of prey.

- Red-backed shrike, Lanius collurio (A) LC
- Red-tailed shrike, Lanius phoenicuroides LC
- Isabelline shrike, Lanius isabellinus LC
- Brown shrike, Lanius cristatus (A) LC
- Bay-backed shrike, Lanius vittatus LC
- Long-tailed shrike, Lanius schach LC
- Great gray shrike, Lanius excubitor LC
- Lesser gray shrike, Lanius minor LC
- Woodchat shrike, Lanius senator (A) NT

== Crows, jays, and magpies ==
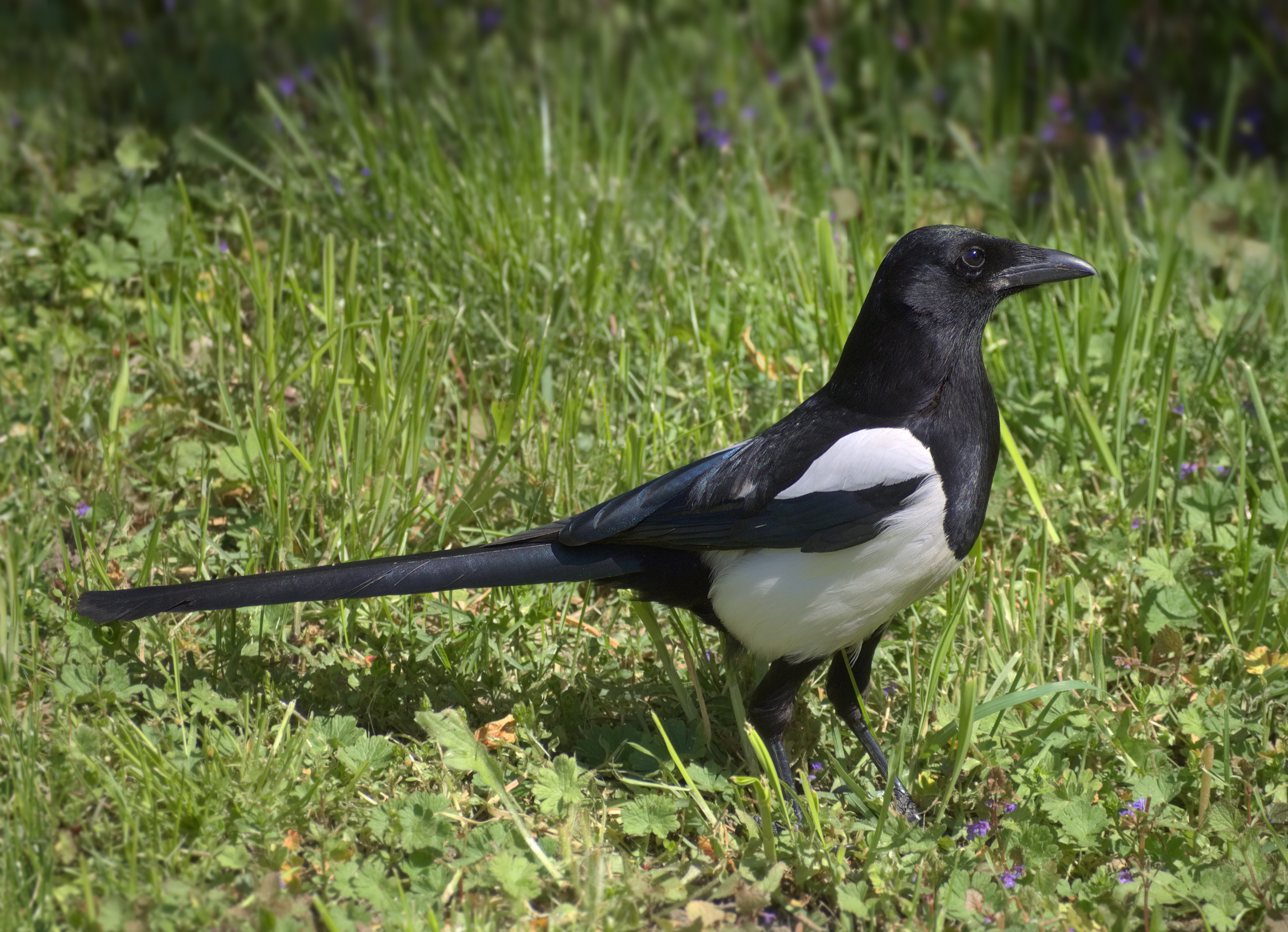
Eurasian magpie

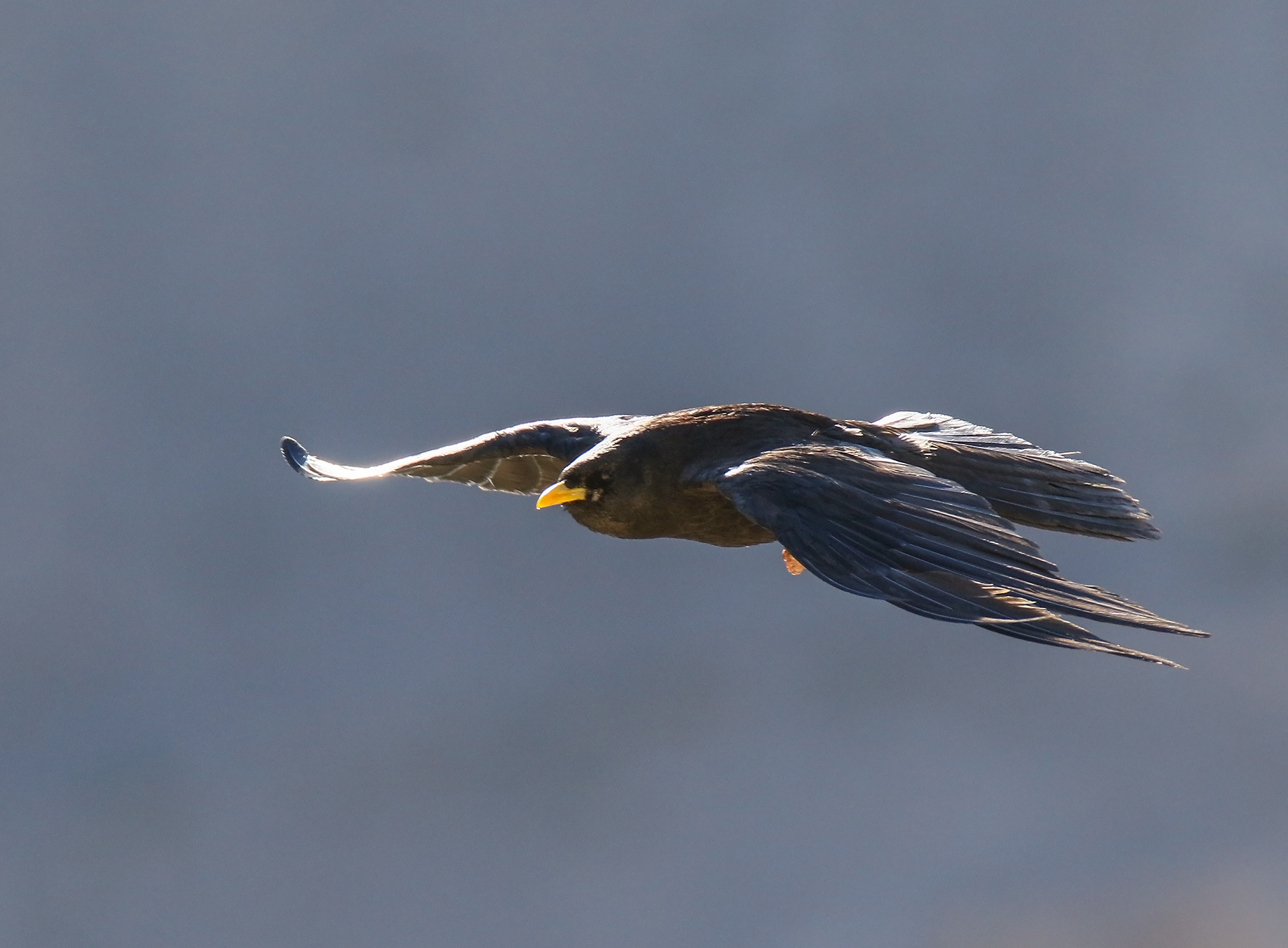
Yellow-billed chough in flight

Order: Passeriformes Family: Corvidae

The family Corvidae includes crows, ravens, jays, choughs, magpies, treepies, nutcrackers and ground jays. Corvids are above average in size among the Passeriformes, and some of the larger species show high levels of intelligence.

- Black-headed jay, Garrulus lanceolatus LC
- Eurasian magpie, Pica pica LC
- Spotted nutcracker, Nucifraga caryocatactes LC
- Kashmir nutcracker, Nucifraga multipunctata LC
- Red-billed chough, Pyrrhocorax pyrrhocorax LC
- Alpine chough, Pyrrhocorax graculus LC
- Western jackdaw, Corvus monedula LC
- House crow, Corvus splendens (A) LC
- Rook, Corvus frugilegus LC
- Carrion crow, Corvus corone LC
- Hooded crow, Corvus cornix NE
- Large-billed crow, Corvus macrorhynchos LC
- Brown-necked raven, Corvus ruficollis LC
- Common raven, Corvus corax LC

== Tits, chickadees, and titmice ==
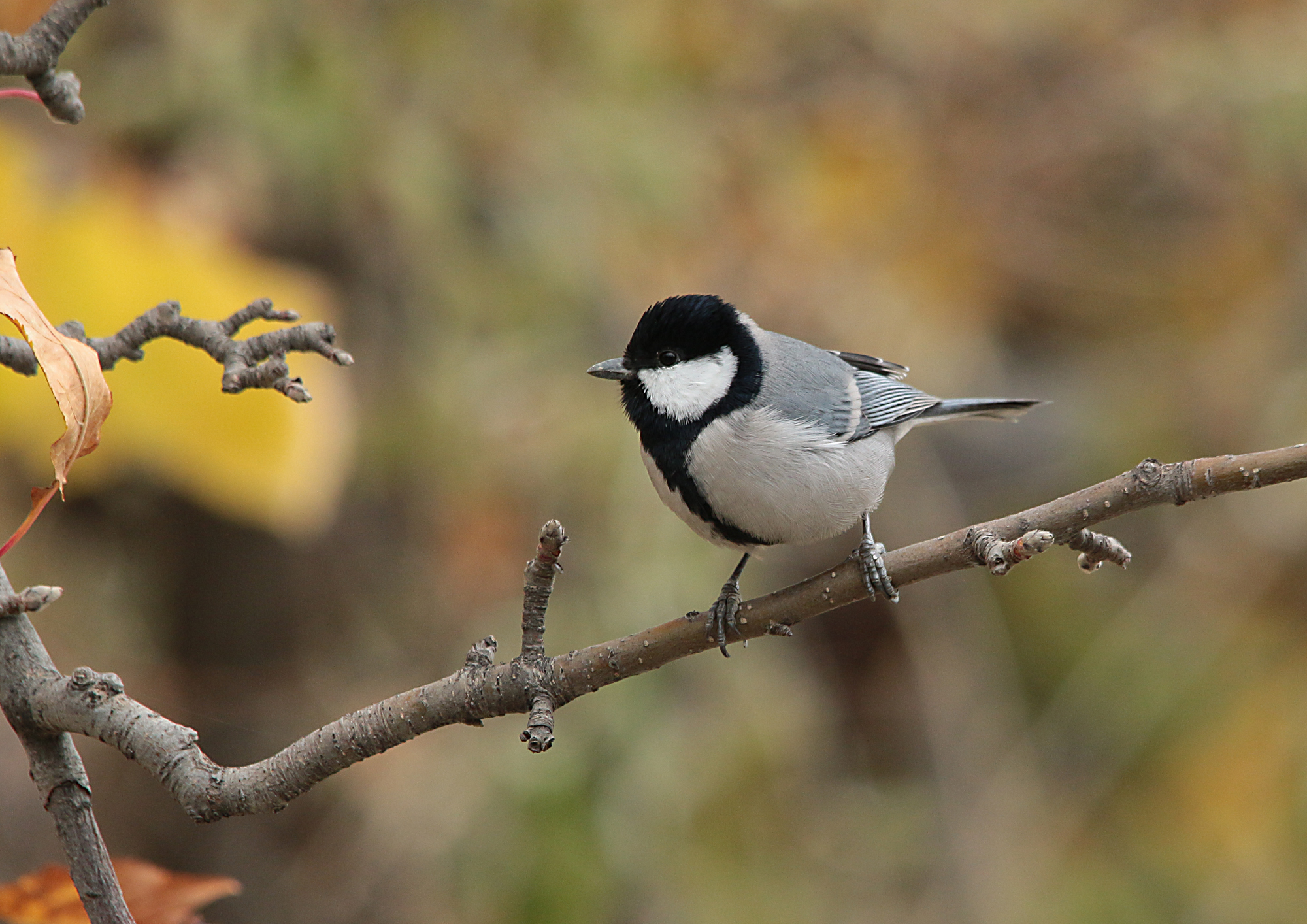
Cinereous tit

Order: Passeriformes Family: Paridae

The Paridae are mainly small stocky woodland species with short stout bills. Some have crests. They are adaptable birds, with a mixed diet including seeds and insects.

- Coal tit, Periparus ater LC
- Rufous-naped tit, Periparus rufonuchalis LC
- Azure tit, Cyanistes cyanus LC
- Ground tit, Pseudopodoces humilis LC
- Great tit, Parus major LC
- Cinereous tit, Parus cinereus LC

== Penduline-tits ==
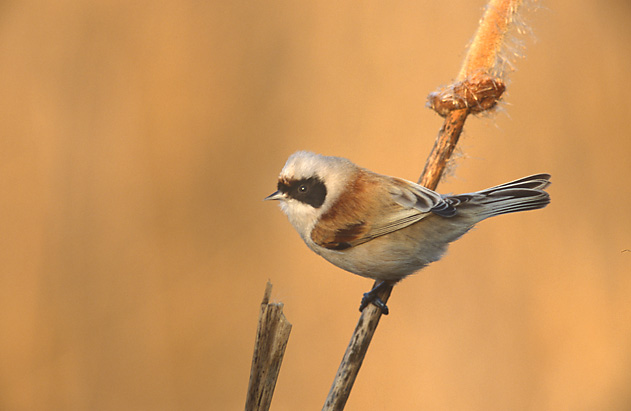
Eurasian penduline-tit

Order: Passeriformes Family: Remizidae

The penduline-tits are a group of small passerine birds related to the true tits. They are insectivores.

- Eurasian penduline-tit, Remiz pendulinus LC
- Black-headed penduline-tit, Remiz macronyx LC
- White-crowned penduline-tit, Remiz coronatus LC

== Larks ==
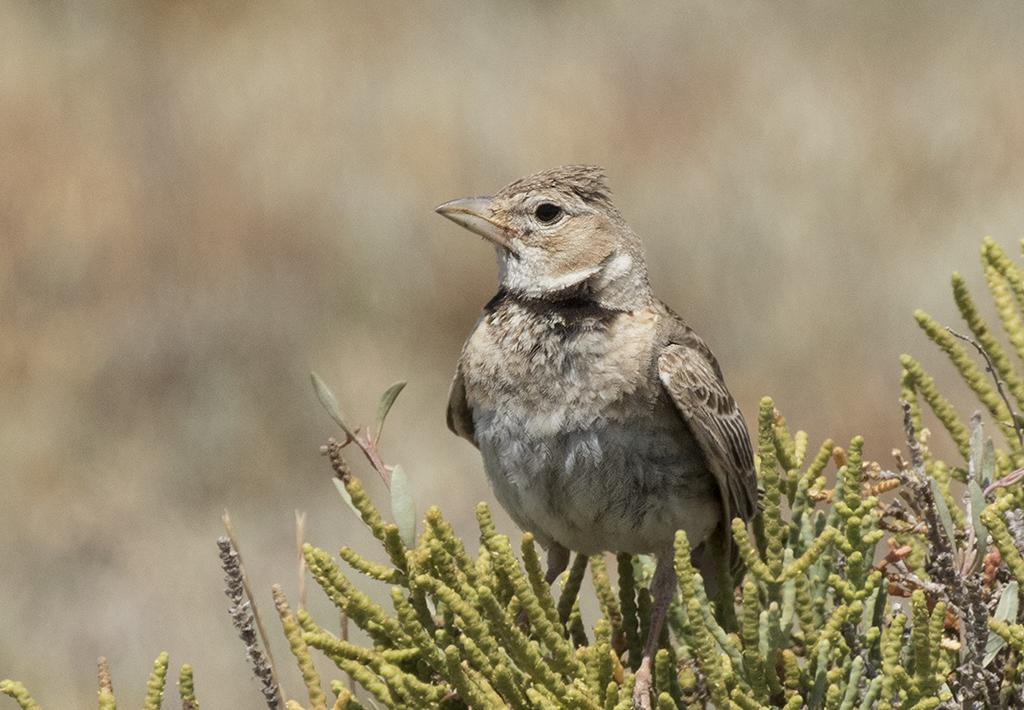
Calandra lark

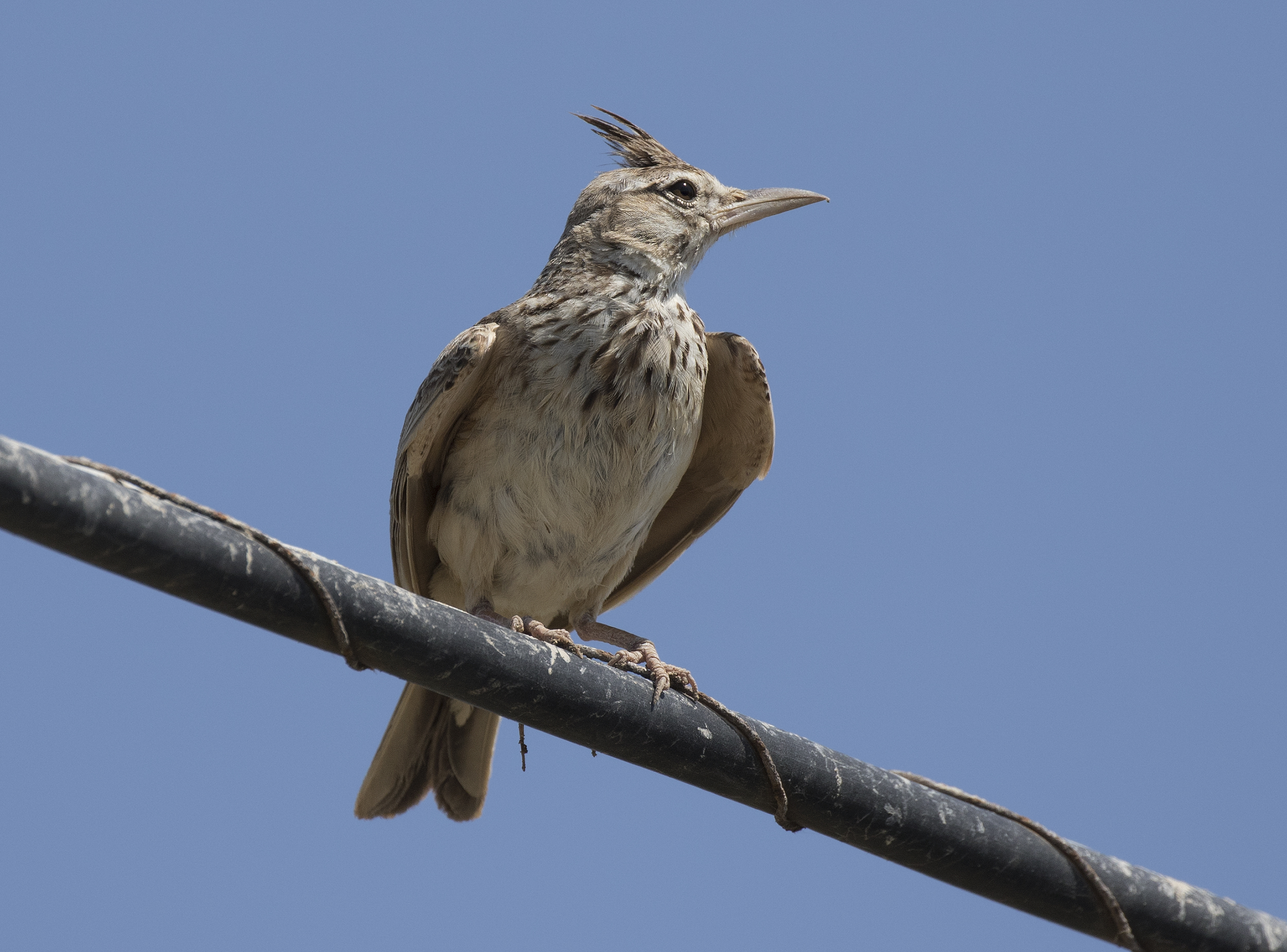
Crested lark

Order: Passeriformes Family: Alaudidae

Larks are small terrestrial birds with often extravagant songs and display flights. Most larks are fairly dull in appearance. Their food is insects and seeds.

- Greater hoopoe-lark, Alaemon alaudipes LC
- Bar-tailed lark, Ammomanes cincturus LC
- Desert lark, Ammomanes deserti LC
- Horned lark, Eremophila alpestris LC
- Greater short-toed lark, Calandrella brachydactyla LC
- Hume's short-toed lark, Calandrella acutirostris LC
- Bimaculated lark, Melanocorypha bimaculata LC
- Calandra lark, Melanocorypha calandra LC
- Turkestan short-toed lark, Alaudala heinei NE
- Sand lark, Alaudala raytal (A) LC
- Woodlark, Lullula arborea (A) LC
- Eurasian skylark, Alauda arvensis LC
- Oriental skylark, Alauda gulgula LC
- Crested lark, Galerida cristata LC

== Bearded reedling ==
Order: Passeriformes Family: Panuridae

This species, the only one in its family, is found in reed beds throughout temperate Europe and Asia.

- Bearded reedling, Panurus biarmicus LC

== Cisticolas and allies ==
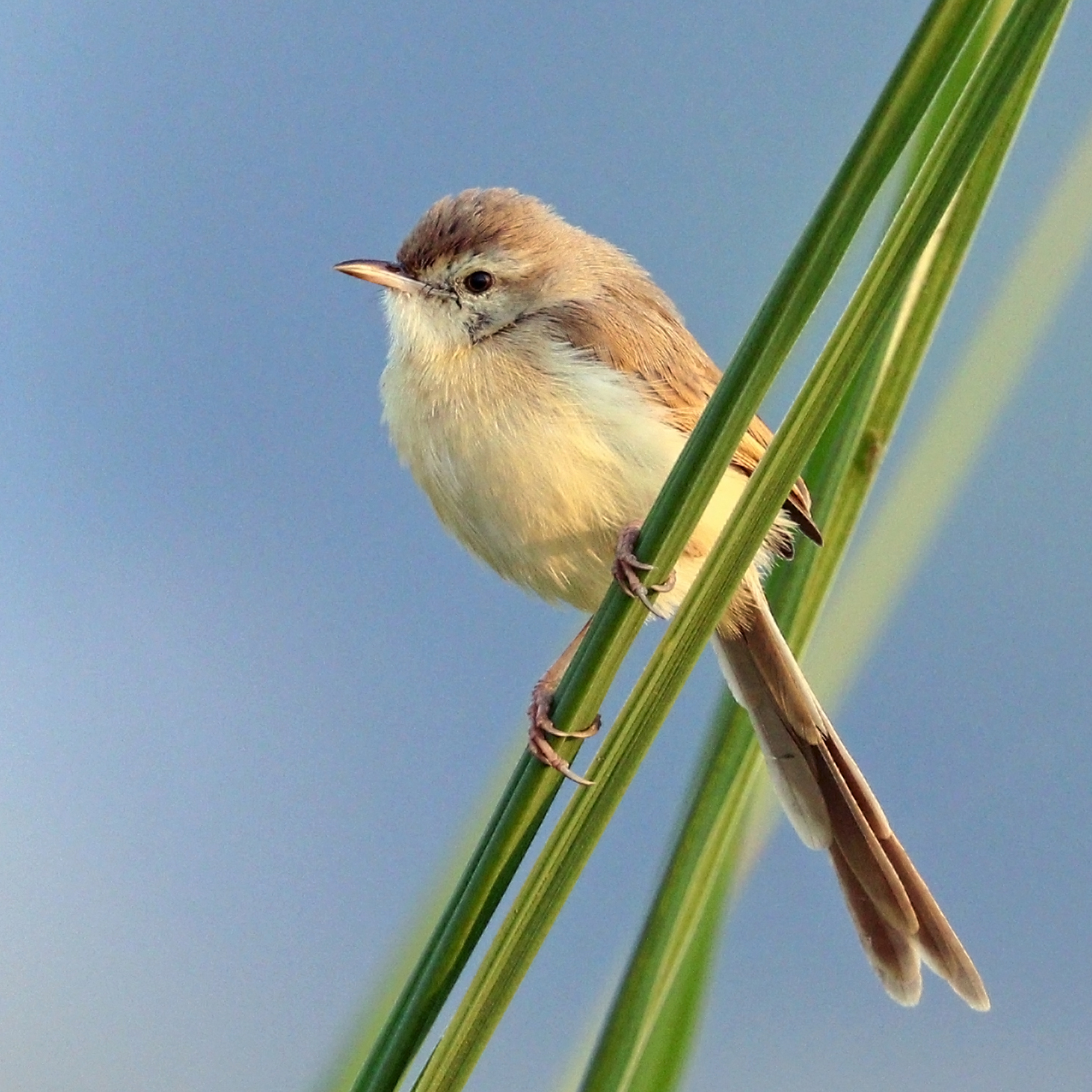
Plain prinia

Order: Passeriformes Family: Cisticolidae

The Cisticolidae are warblers found mainly in warmer southern regions of the Old World. They are generally very small birds of drab brown or grey appearance found in open country such as grassland or scrub.

- Himalayan prinia, Prinia crinigera LC
- Delicate prinia, Prinia lepida NE
- Plain prinia, Prinia inornata (A) LC
- Zitting cisticola, Cisticola juncidis LC

== Reed warblers and allies ==
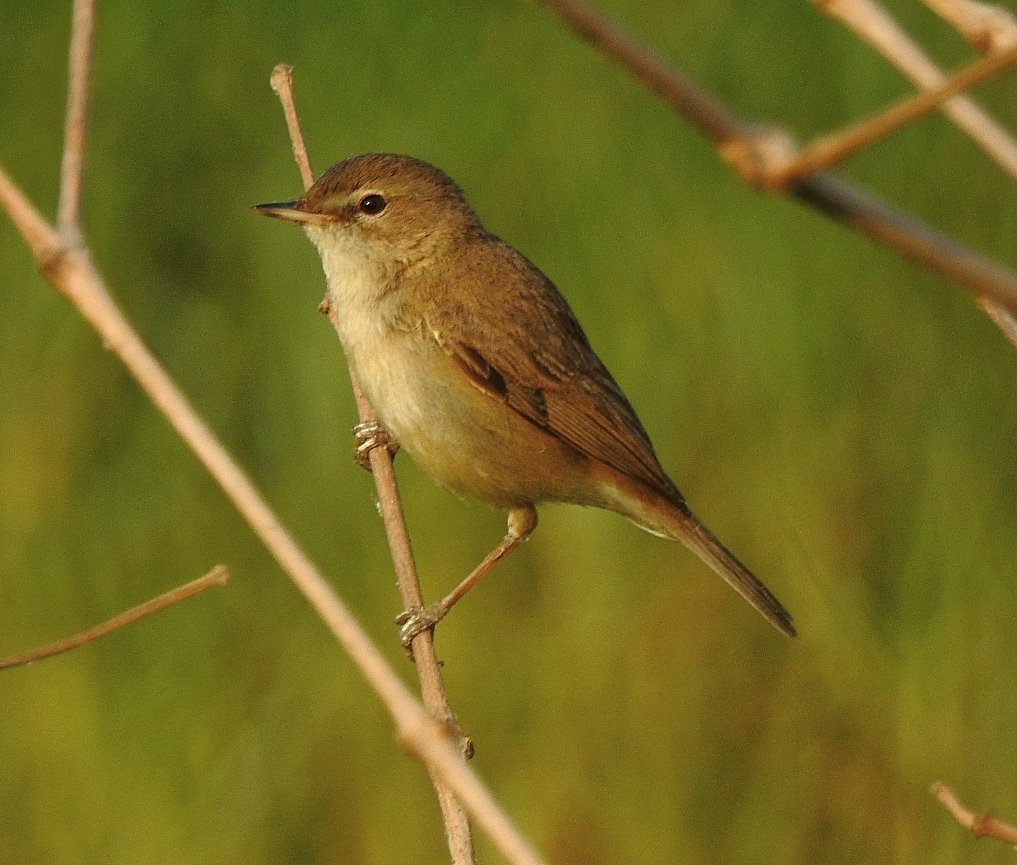
Booted warbler

Order: Passeriformes Family: Acrocephalidae

The members of this family are usually rather large for "warblers". Most are rather plain olivaceous brown above with much yellow to beige below. They are usually found in open woodland, reedbeds, or tall grass. The family occurs mostly in southern to western Eurasia and surroundings, but it also ranges far into the Pacific, with some species in Africa.

- Booted warbler, Iduna caligata LC
- Sykes's warbler, Iduna rama LC
- Eastern olivaceous warbler, Iduna pallida (A) LC
- Upcher's warbler, Hippolais languida LC
- Moustached warbler, Acrocephalus melanopogon LC
- Paddyfield warbler, Acrocephalus agricola LC
- Blunt-winged warbler, Acrocephalus concinens LC
- Blyth's reed warbler, Acrocephalus dumetorum LC
- Large-billed reed warbler, Acrocephalus orinus LC
- Common reed warbler, Acrocephalus scirpaceus LC
- Great reed warbler, Acrocephalus arundinaceus LC
- Clamorous reed warbler, Acrocephalus stentoreus LC

== Grassbirds and allies ==
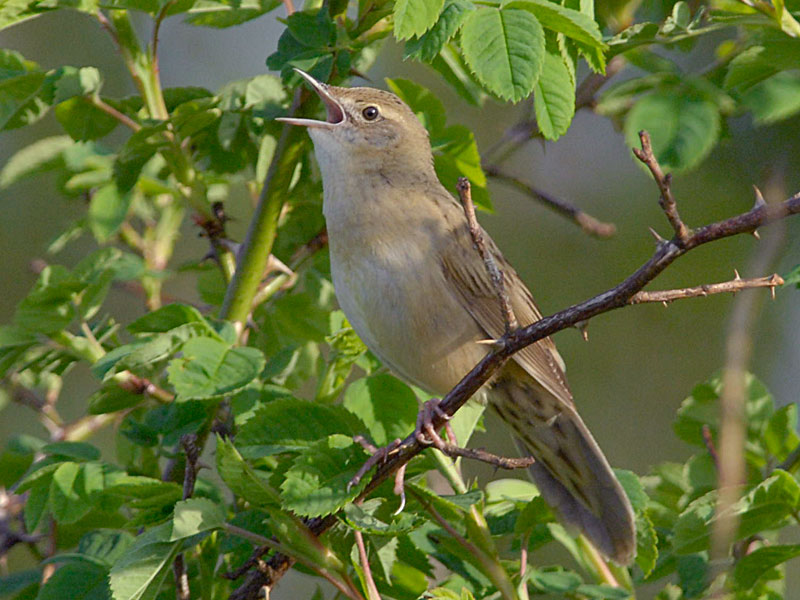
A singing common grasshopper-warbler

Order: Passeriformes Family: Locustellidae

Locustellidae are a family of small insectivorous songbirds found mainly in Eurasia, Africa, and the Australian region. They are smallish birds with tails that are usually long and pointed, and tend to be drab brownish or buffy all over.

- Common grasshopper warbler, Locustella naevia LC

== Swallows ==
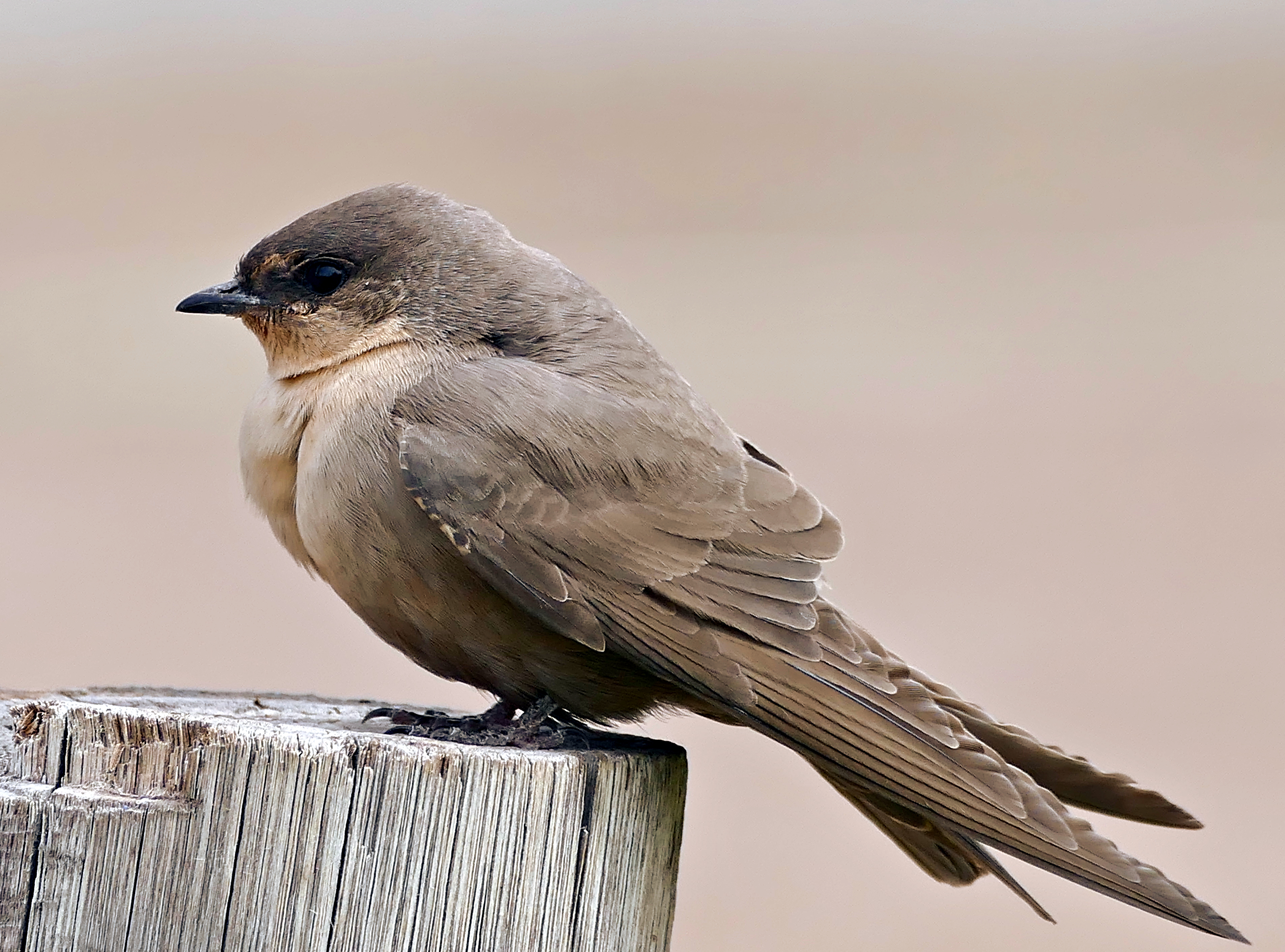
Rock martin

Order: Passeriformes Family: Hirundinidae

The family Hirundinidae is adapted to aerial feeding. They have a slender streamlined body, long pointed wings and a short bill with a wide gape. The feet are adapted to perching rather than walking, and the front toes are partially joined at the base.

- Gray-throated martin, Riparia chinensis LC
- Sand martin, Riparia riparia LC
- Pale martin, Riparia diluta LC
- Eurasian crag-martin, Ptyonoprogne rupestris LC
- Rock martin, Ptyonoprogne fuligula LC
- Barn swallow, Hirundo rustica LC
- Wire-tailed swallow, Hirundo smithii LC
- Red-rumped swallow, Cecropis daurica LC
- Streak-throated swallow, Petrochelidon fluvicola LC
- Western house martin, Delichon urbicum LC
- Asian house martin, Delichon dasypus LC

== Bulbuls ==
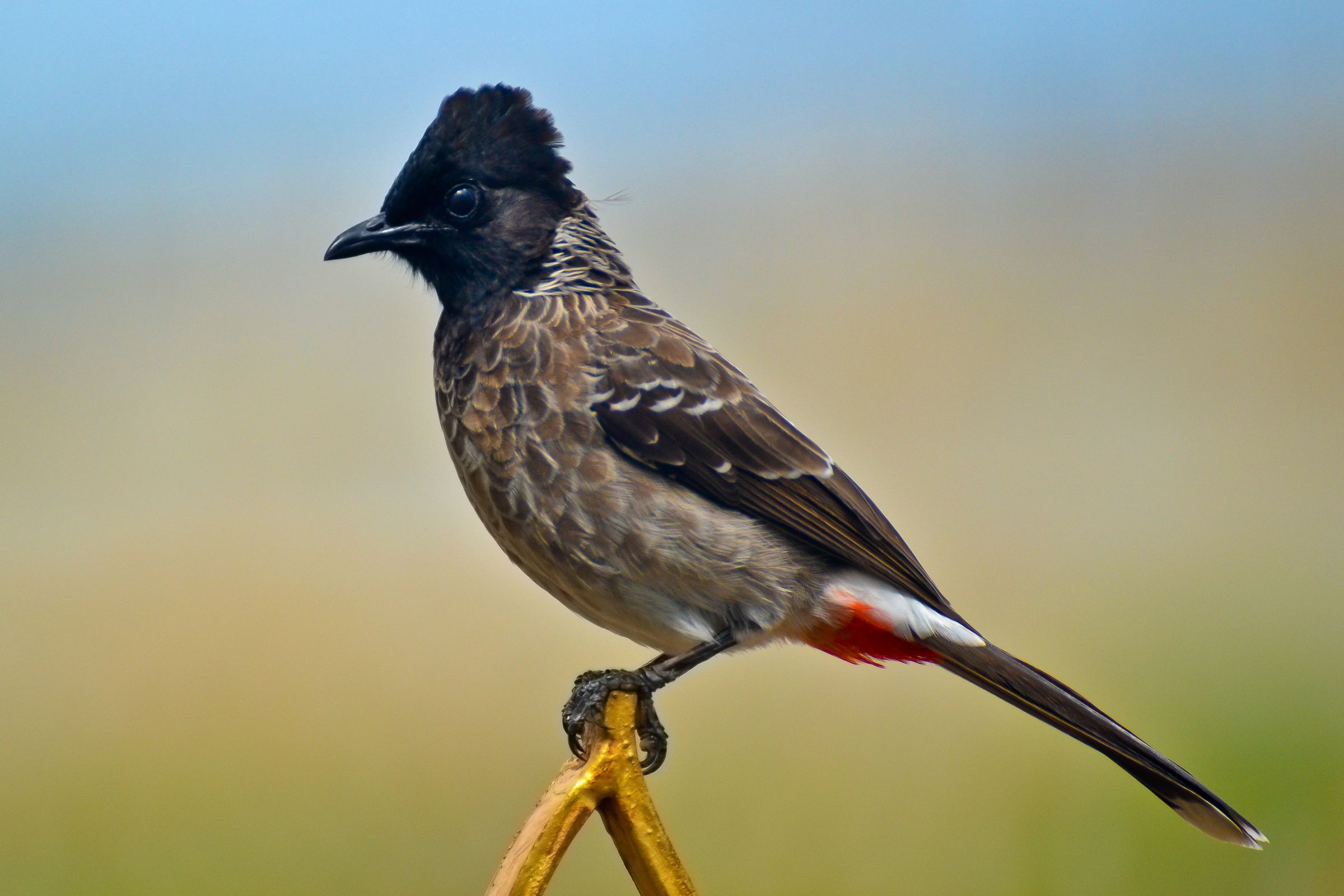
Red-vented bulbul

Order: Passeriformes Family: Pycnonotidae

Bulbuls are medium-sized songbirds. Some are colourful with yellow, red or orange vents, cheeks, throats or supercilia, but most are drab, with uniform olive-brown to black plumage. Some species have distinct crests.

- Red-vented bulbul, Pycnonotus cafer LC
- White-eared bulbul, Pycnonotus leucotis LC
- Himalayan bulbul, Pycnonotus leucogenys LC
- Black bulbul, Hypsipetes leucocephalus LC

== Leaf warblers ==
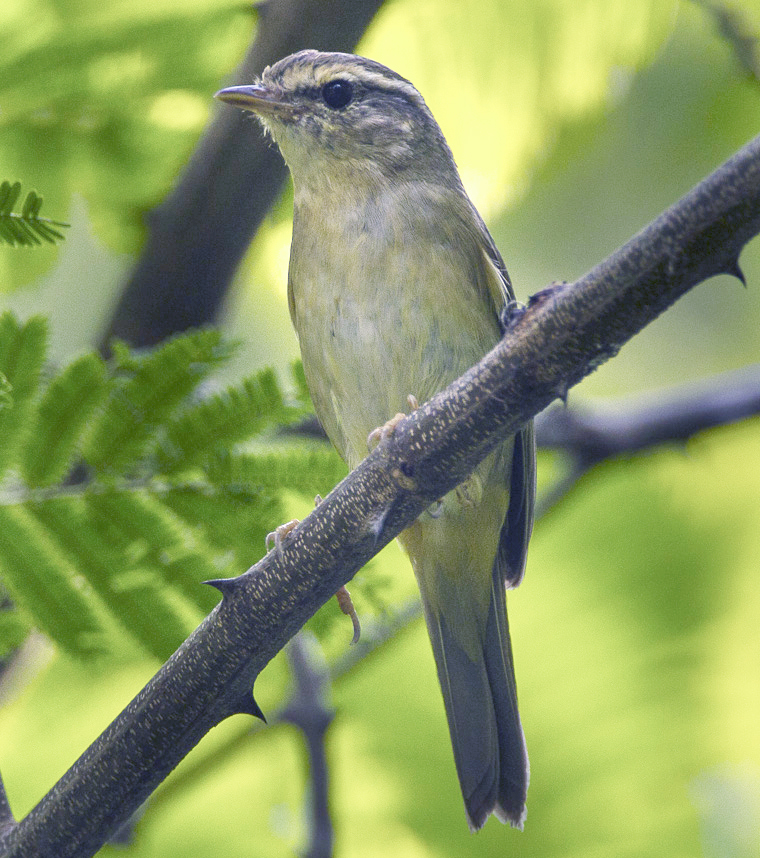
Radde's warbler

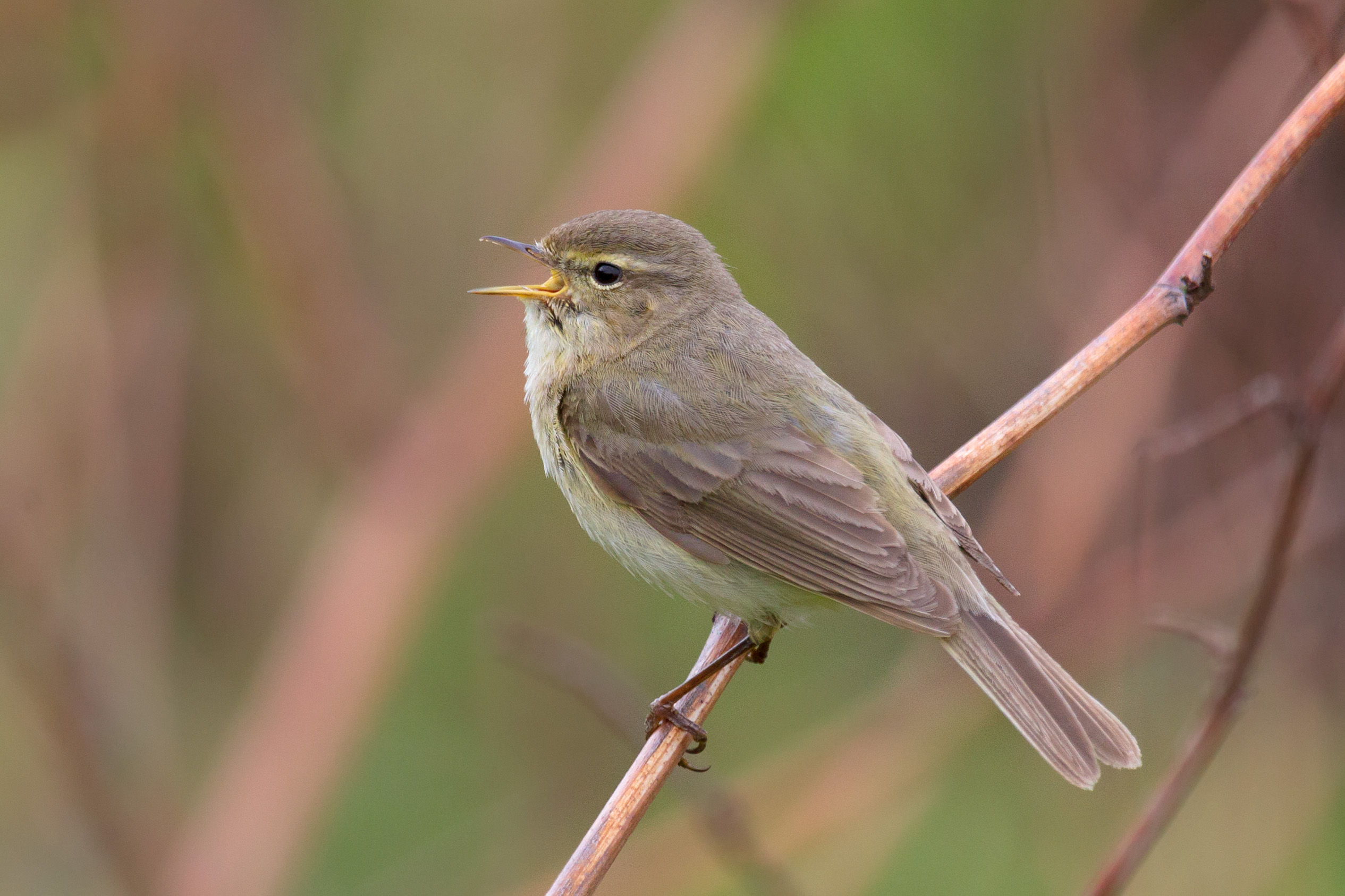
Common chiffchaff

Order: Passeriformes Family: Phylloscopidae

Leaf warblers are a family of small insectivorous birds found mostly in Eurasia and ranging into Wallacea and Africa. The species are of various sizes, often green-plumaged above and yellow below, or more subdued with grayish-green to grayish-brown colors.

- Wood warbler, Phylloscopus sibilatrix (A) LC
- Hume's leaf warbler, Phylloscopus humei LC
- Brooks's leaf warbler, Phylloscopus subviridis LC
- Pallas's leaf warbler, Phylloscopus proregulus LC
- Lemon-rumped warbler, Phylloscopus chloronotus LC
- Tytler's leaf warbler, Phylloscopus tytleri LC
- Radde's warbler, Phylloscopus schwarzi LC
- Sulphur-bellied warbler, Phylloscopus griseolus LC
- Plain leaf warbler, Phylloscopus neglectus LC
- Willow warbler, Phylloscopus trochilus LC
- Mountain chiffchaff, Phylloscopus sindianus LC
- Common chiffchaff, Phylloscopus collybita LC
- Green warbler, Phylloscopus nitidus LC
- Greenish warbler, Phylloscopus trochiloides LC
- Arctic warbler, Phylloscopus borealis (A) LC
- Western crowned warbler, Phylloscopus occipitalis LC

== Bush warblers and allies ==
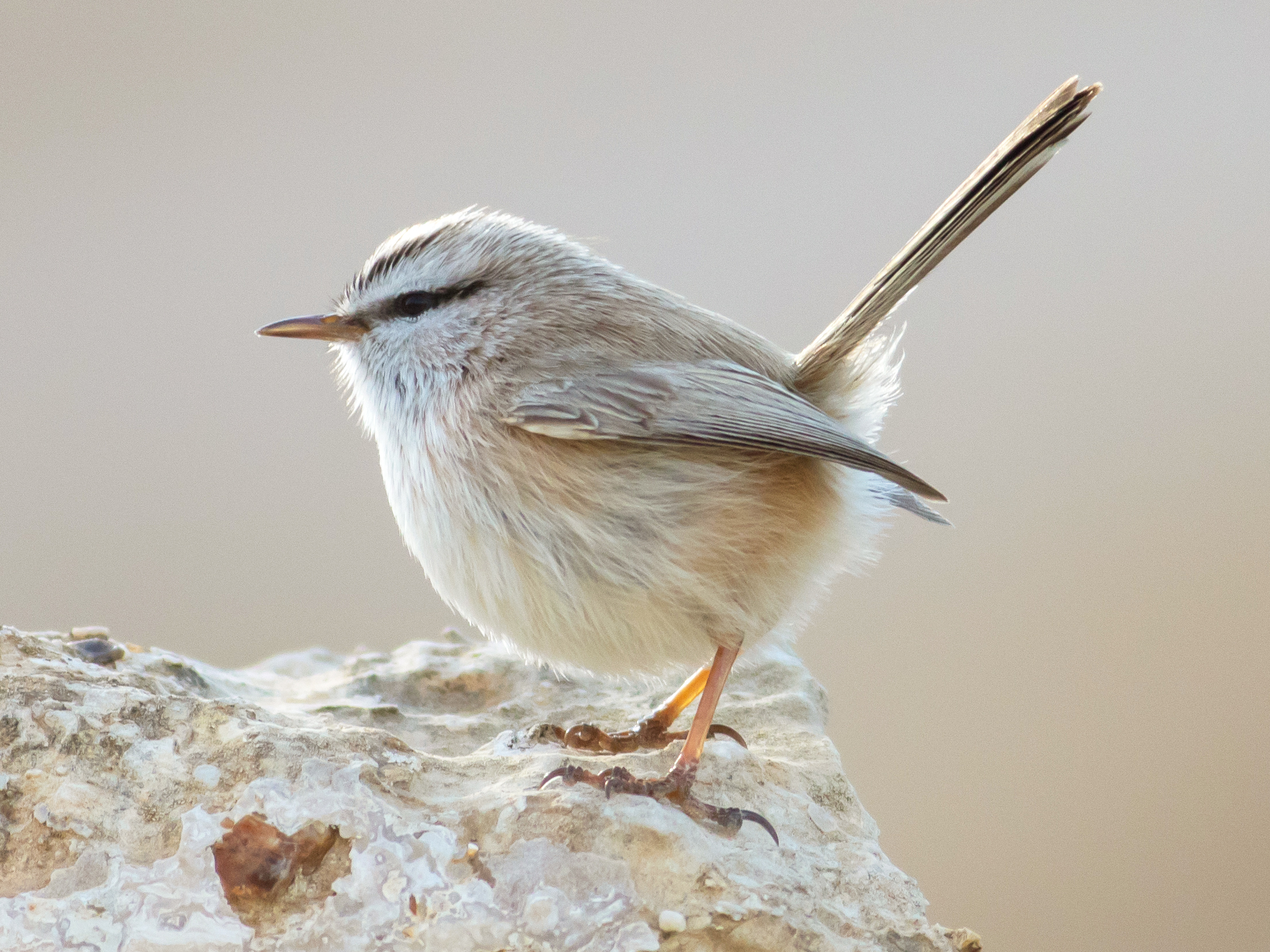
Scrub warbler

Order: Passeriformes Family: Scotocercidae

The members of this family are found throughout Africa, Asia, and Polynesia. Their taxonomy is in flux, and some authorities place some genera in other families.

- Streaked scrub warbler, Scotocerca inquieta LC
- Cetti's warbler, Cettia cetti LC

== Long-tailed tits ==
Order: Passeriformes Family: Aegithalidae

Long-tailed tits are a group of small passerine birds with medium to long tails. They make woven bag nests in trees. Most eat a mixed diet which includes insects.

- White-cheeked bushtit, Aegithalos leucogenys LC

== Sylviid warblers, parrotbills, and allies ==
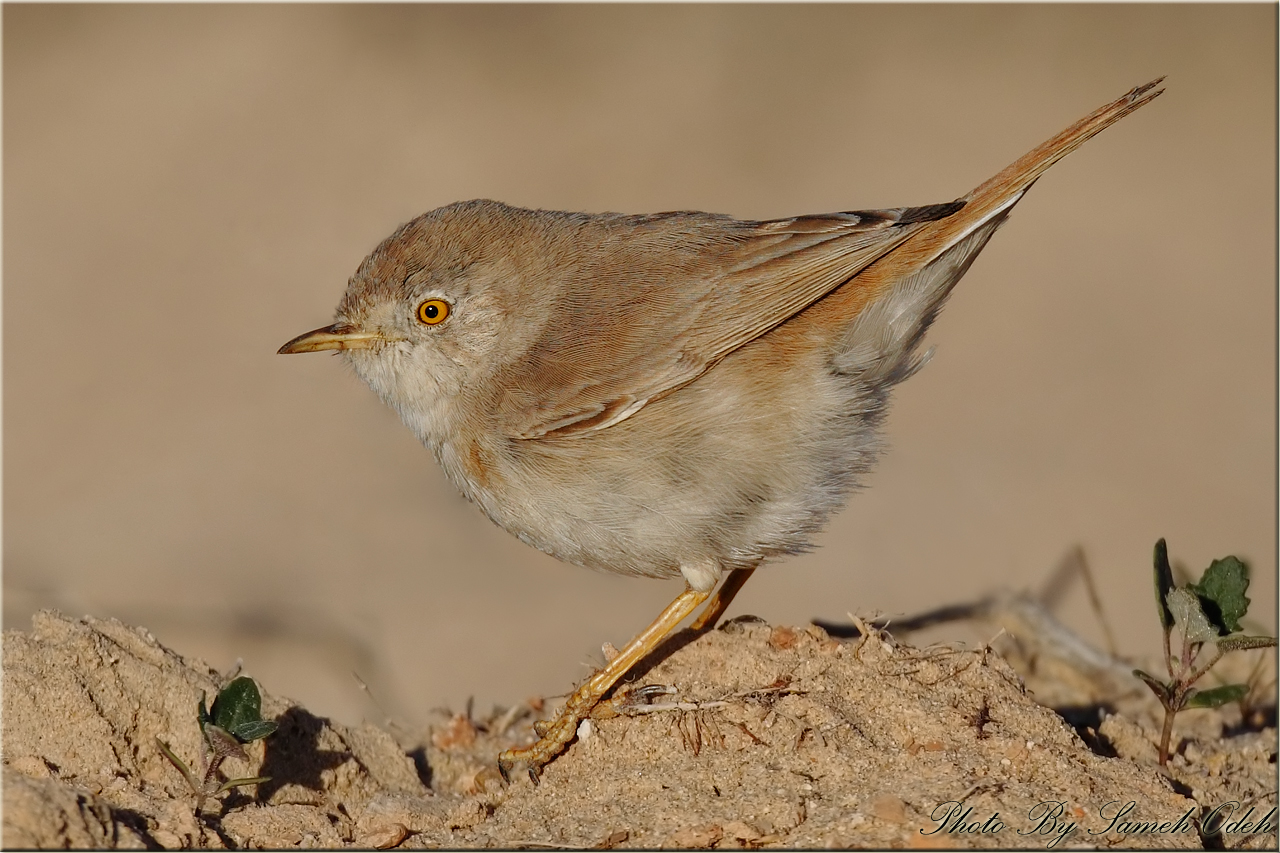
Asian desert warbler

Order: Passeriformes Family: Sylviidae

The family Sylviidae is a group of small insectivorous passerine birds. They mainly occur as breeding species, as the common name implies, in Europe, Asia and, to a lesser extent, Africa. Most are of generally undistinguished appearance, but many have distinctive songs.

- Garden warbler, Sylvia borin (A) LC
- Asian desert warbler, Curruca nana LC
- Barred warbler, Curruca nisoria (A) LC
- Lesser whitethroat, Curruca curruca LC
- Eastern Orphean warbler, Curruca crassirostris LC
- Menetries's warbler, Curruca mystacea LC
- Common whitethroat, Curruca communis LC

== White-eyes, yuhinas, and allies ==
Order: Passeriformes Family: Zosteropidae

The white-eyes are small and mostly undistinguished, their plumage above being generally some dull colour like greenish-olive, but some species have a white or bright yellow throat, breast or lower parts, and several have buff flanks. As their name suggests, many species have a white ring around each eye.

- Indian white-eye, Zosterops palpebrosus LC

== Laughingthrushes ==
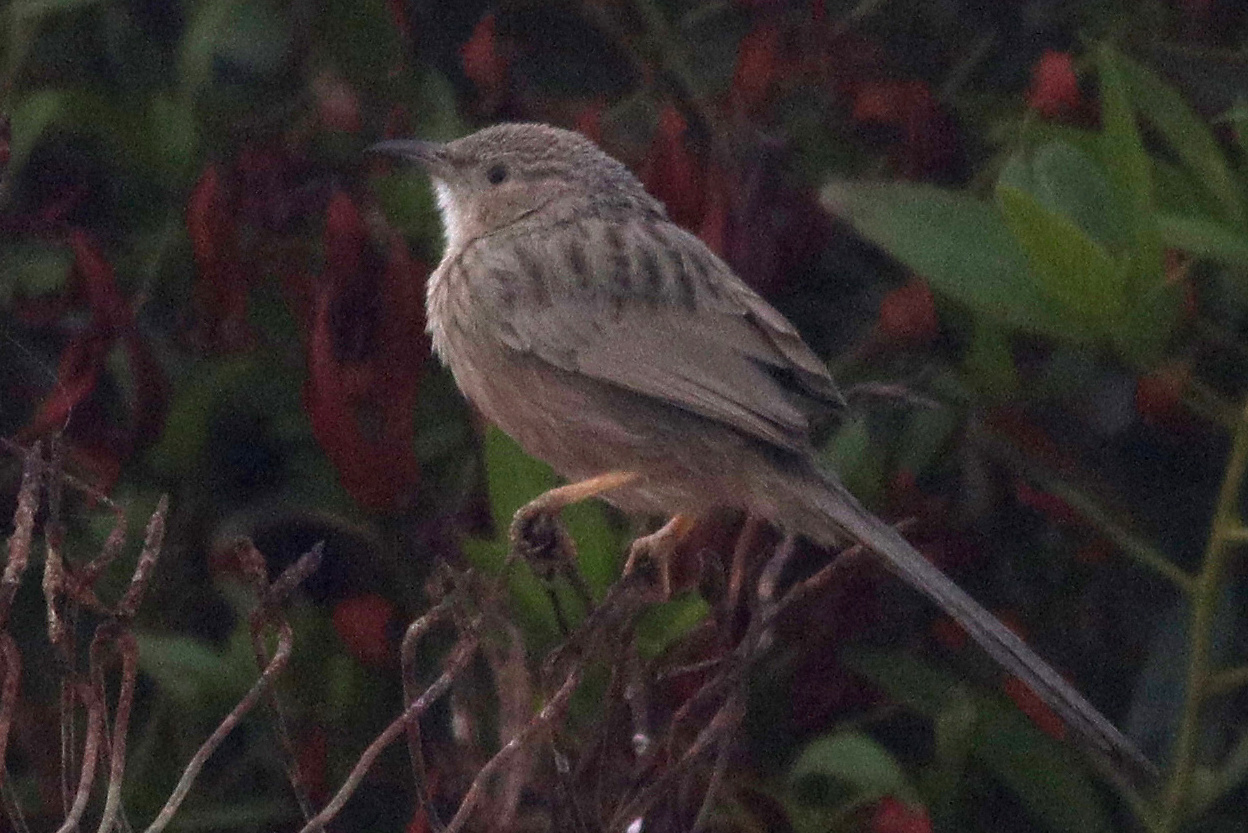
Afghan babbler

Order: Passeriformes Family: Leiothrichidae

The members of this family are diverse in size and coloration, though those of genus Turdoides tend to be brown or grayish. The family is found in Africa, India, and southeast Asia.

- Afghan babbler, Argya huttoni NE
- Common babbler, Argya caudata (A) LC
- Streaked laughingthrush, Trochalopteron lineatus LC
- Variegated laughingthrush, Trochalopteron variegatus LC

== Kinglets ==
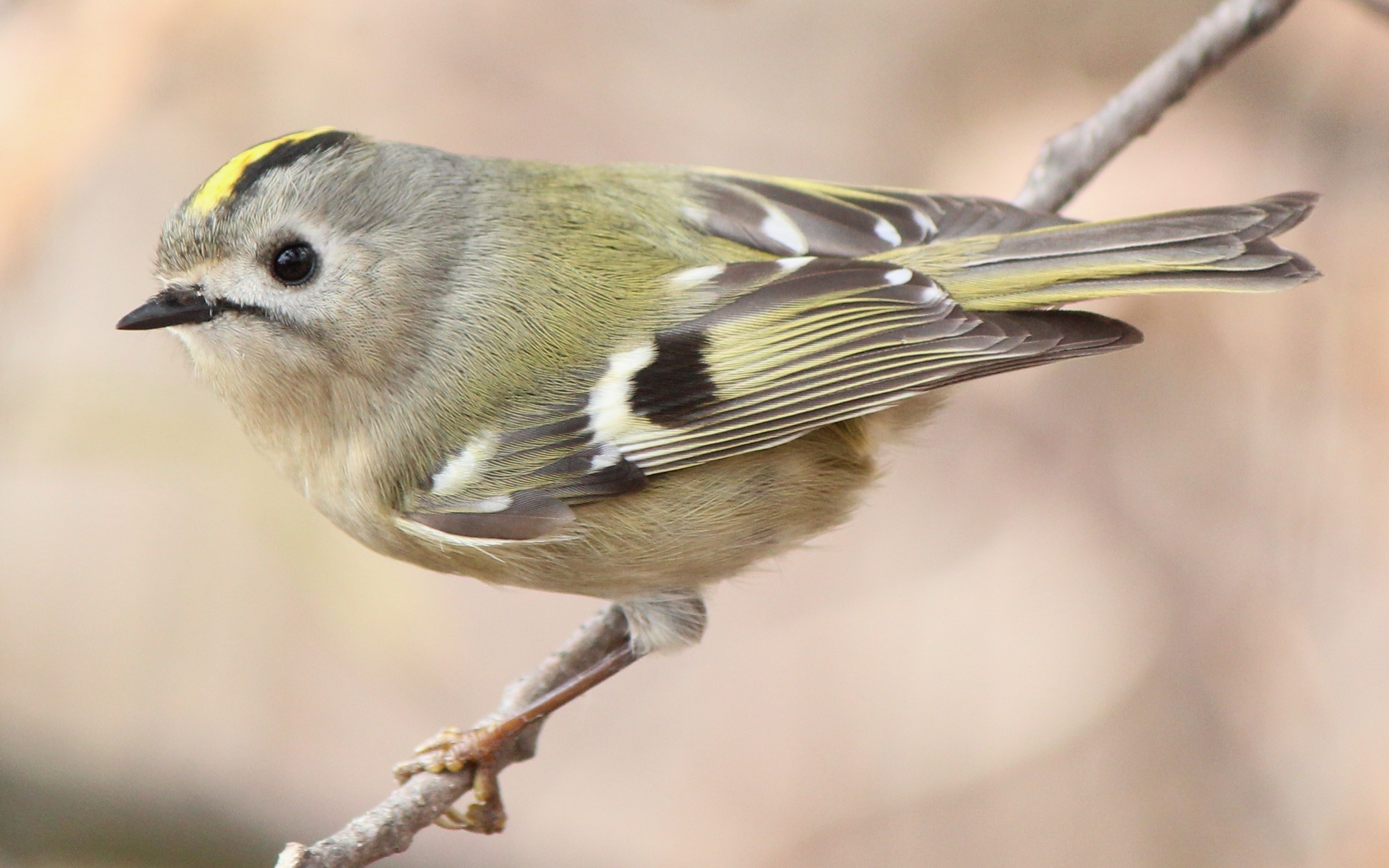
Goldcrest

Order: Passeriformes Family: Regulidae

The kinglets, also called crests, are a small group of birds often included in the Old World warblers, but frequently given family status because they also resemble the titmice.

- Goldcrest, Regulus regulus LC

== Wallcreeper ==
Order: Passeriformes Family: Tichodromidae

The wallcreeper is a small bird related to the nuthatch family, which has stunning crimson, grey and black plumage.

- Wallcreeper, Tichodroma muraria LC

== Nuthatches ==
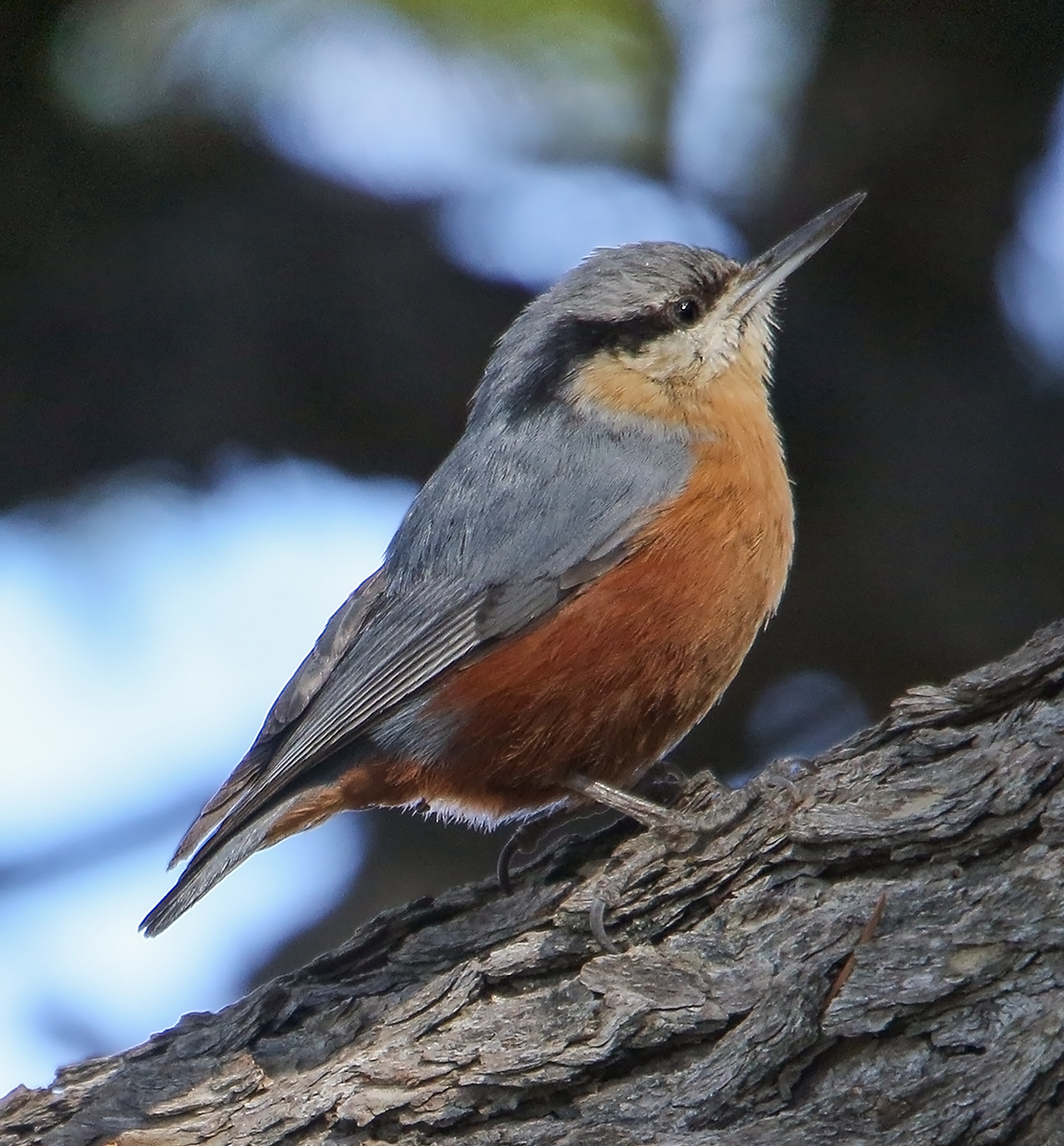
Kashmir nuthatch

Order: Passeriformes Family: Sittidae

Nuthatches are small woodland birds. They have the unusual ability to climb down trees head first, unlike other birds which can only go upwards. Nuthatches have big heads, short tails and powerful bills and feet.

- Eurasian nuthatch, Sitta europaea LC
- Kashmir nuthatch, Sitta cashmirensis LC
- White-cheeked nuthatch, Sitta leucopsis LC
- Eastern rock nuthatch, Sitta tephronota LC

== Treecreepers ==
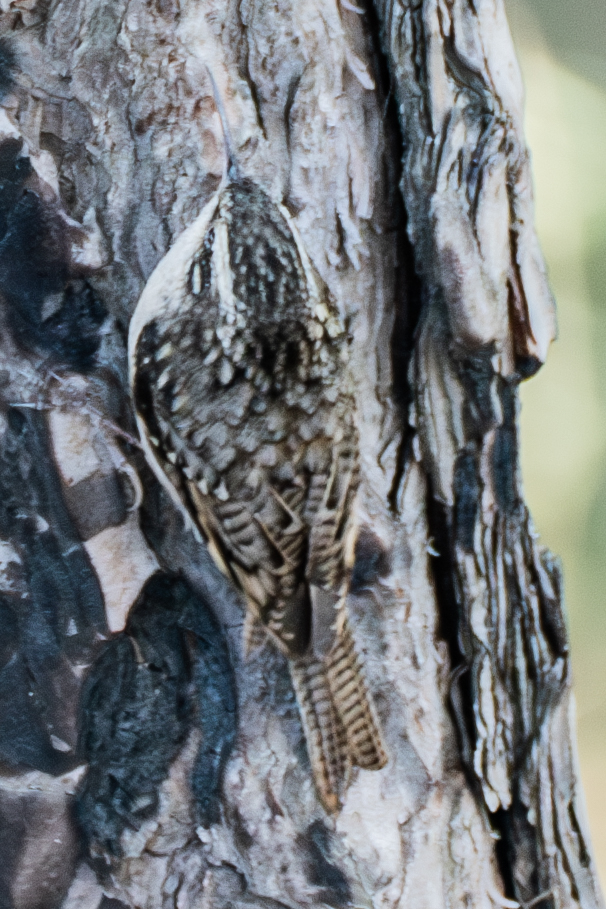
Bar-tailed treecreeper

Order: Passeriformes Family: Certhiidae

Treecreepers are small woodland birds, brown above and white below. They have thin pointed down-curved bills, which they use to extricate insects from bark. They have stiff tail feathers, like woodpeckers, which they use to support themselves on vertical trees.

- Bar-tailed treecreeper, Certhia himalayana LC

== Wrens ==
Order: Passeriformes Family: Troglodytidae

The wrens are mainly small and inconspicuous except for their loud songs. These birds have short wings and thin down-turned bills. Several species often hold their tails upright. All are insectivorous.

- Eurasian wren, Troglodytes troglodytes LC

== Dippers ==
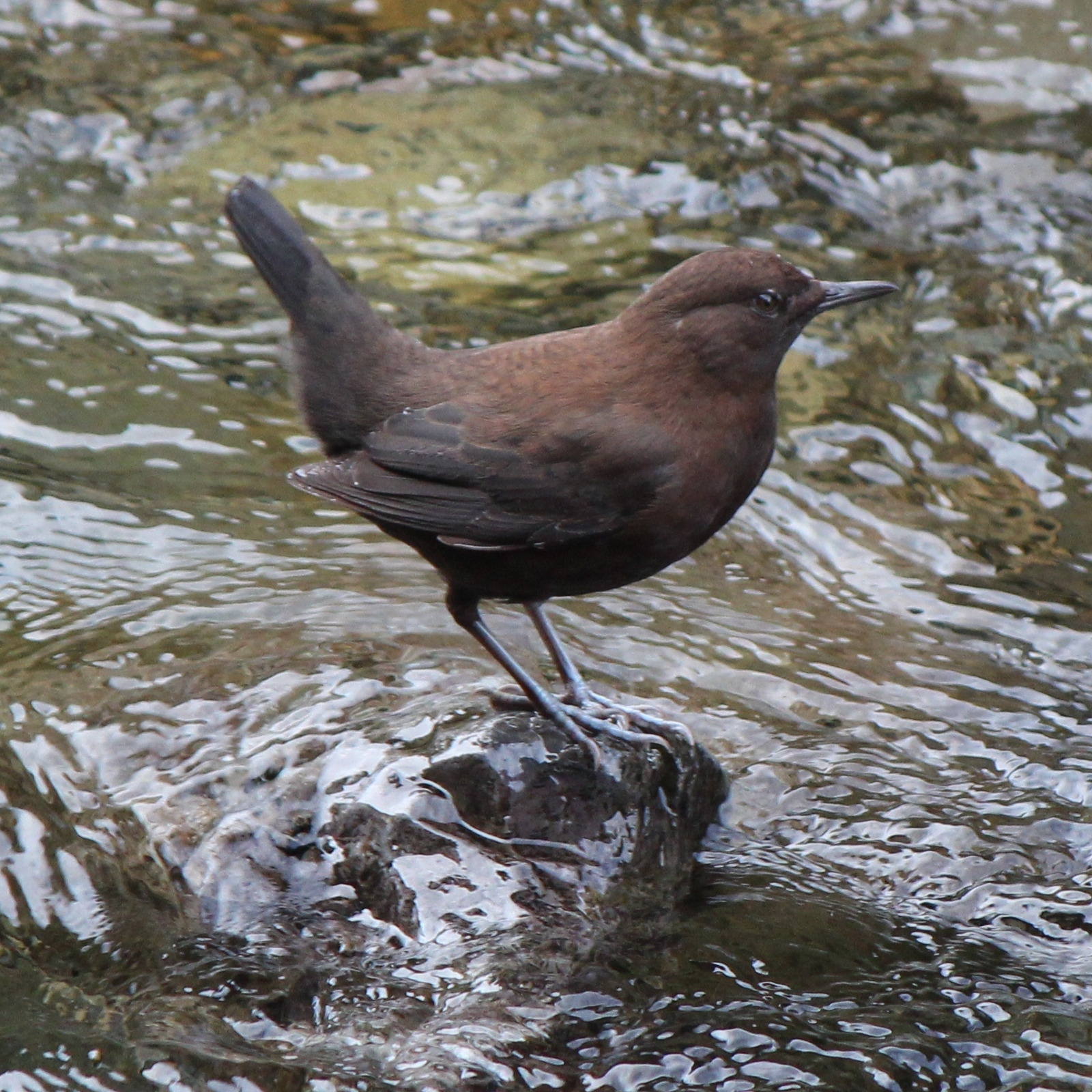
Brown dipper

Order: Passeriformes Family: Cinclidae

Dippers are a group of perching birds whose habitat includes aquatic environments in the Americas, Europe and Asia. They are named for their bobbing or dipping movements.

- White-throated dipper, Cinclus cinclus LC
- Brown dipper, Cinclus pallasii LC

== Starlings ==
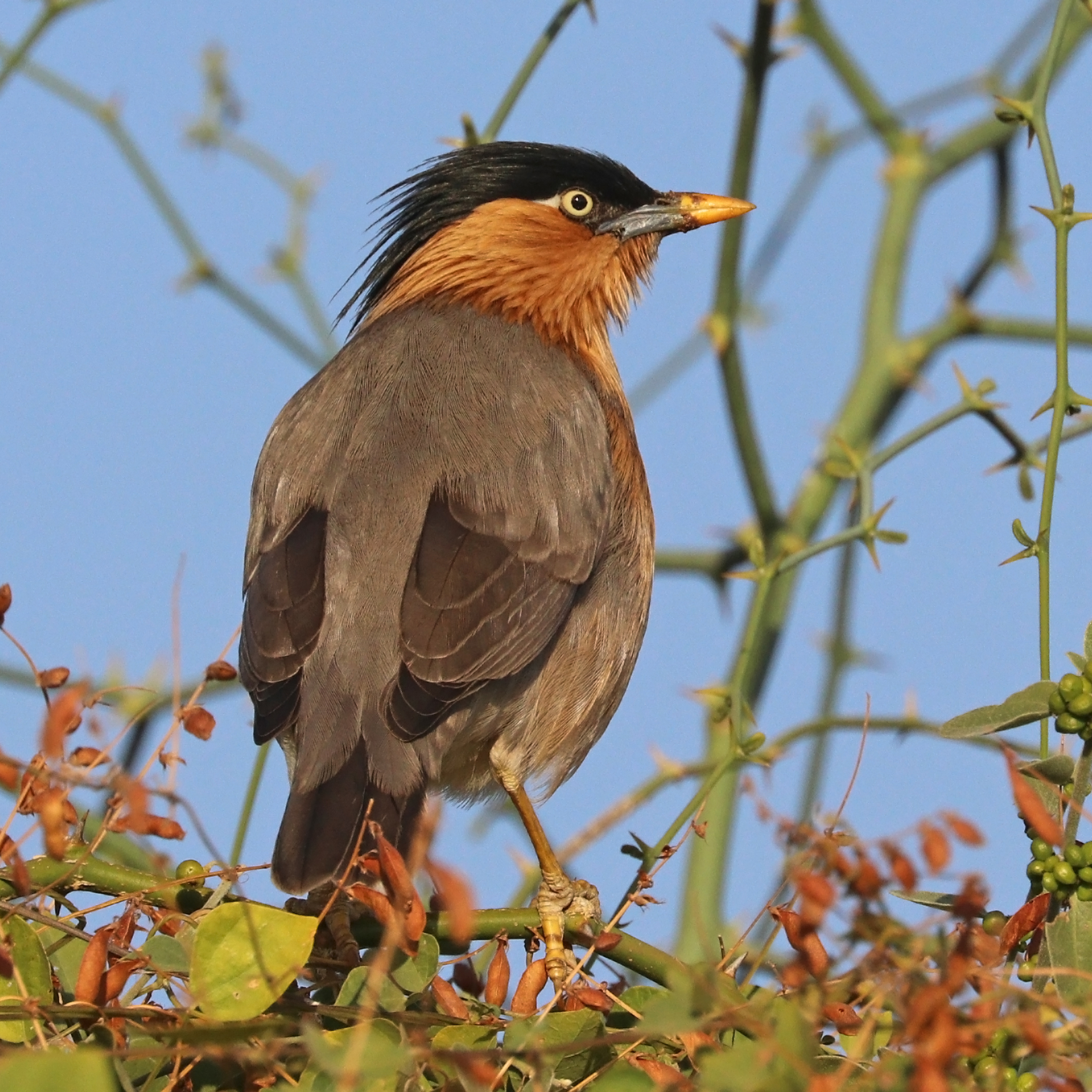
Brahminy starling

Order: Passeriformes Family: Sturnidae

Starlings are small to medium-sized passerine birds. Their flight is strong and direct and they are very gregarious. Their preferred habitat is fairly open country. They eat insects and fruit. Plumage is typically dark with a metallic sheen.

- Common starling, Sturnus vulgaris LC
- Rosy starling, Pastor roseus LC
- Brahminy starling, Sturnia pagodarum LC
- Common myna, Acridotheres tristis LC
- Bank myna, Acridotheres ginginianus (A) LC

== Thrushes and allies ==
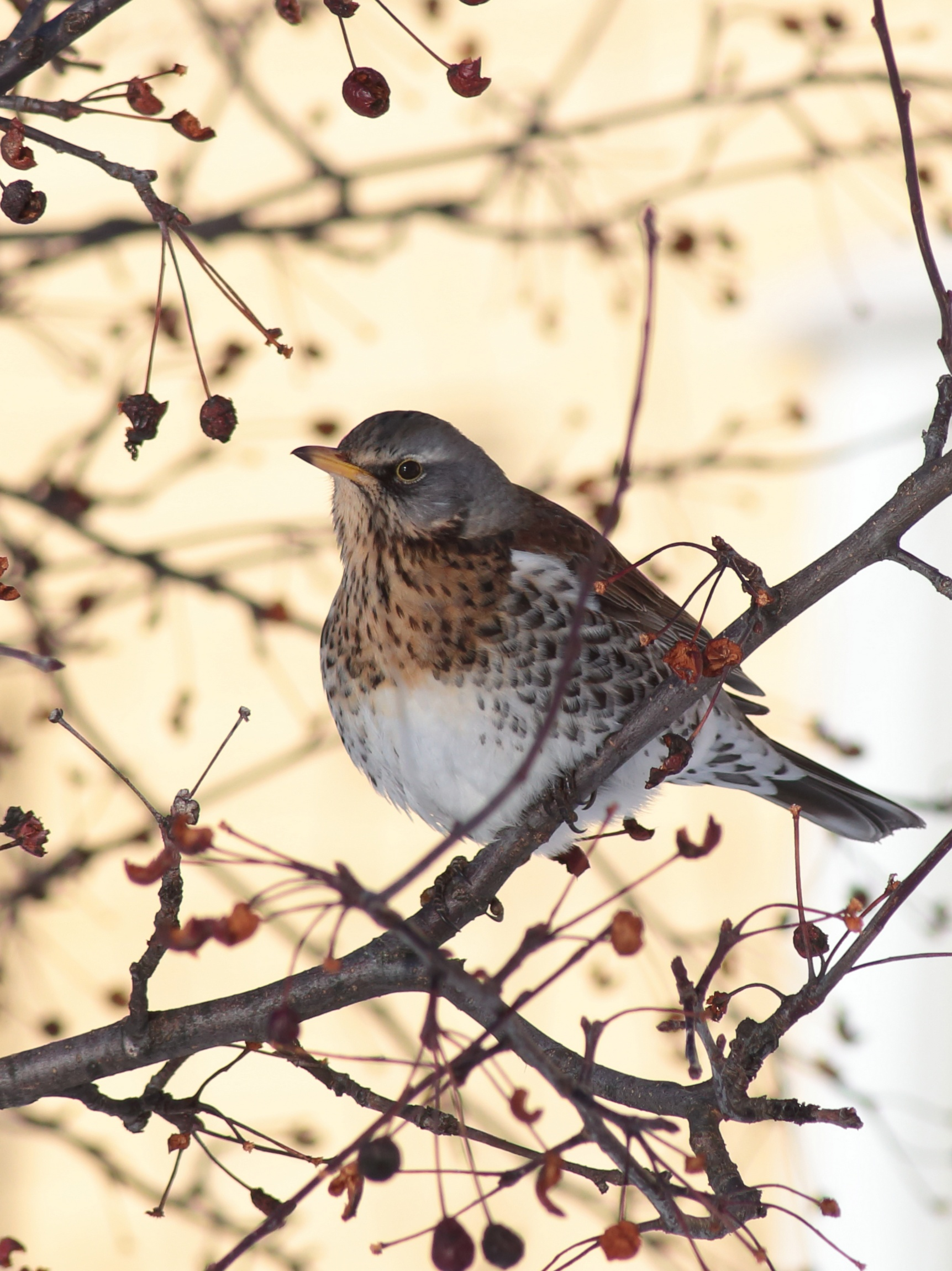
Fieldfare

Order: Passeriformes Family: Turdidae

The thrushes are a group of passerine birds that occur mainly in the Old World. They are plump, soft plumaged, small to medium-sized insectivores or sometimes omnivores, often feeding on the ground. Many have attractive songs.

- Mistle thrush, Turdus viscivorus LC
- Redwing, Turdus iliacus NT
- Common blackbird, Turdus merula LC
- Tickell's thrush, Turdus unicolor LC
- Fieldfare, Turdus pilaris (A) LC
- Chestnut thrush, Turdus rubrocanus LC
- Black-throated thrush, Turdus atrogularis LC
- Red-throated thrush, Turdus ruficollis (A) LC

== Old World flycatchers ==
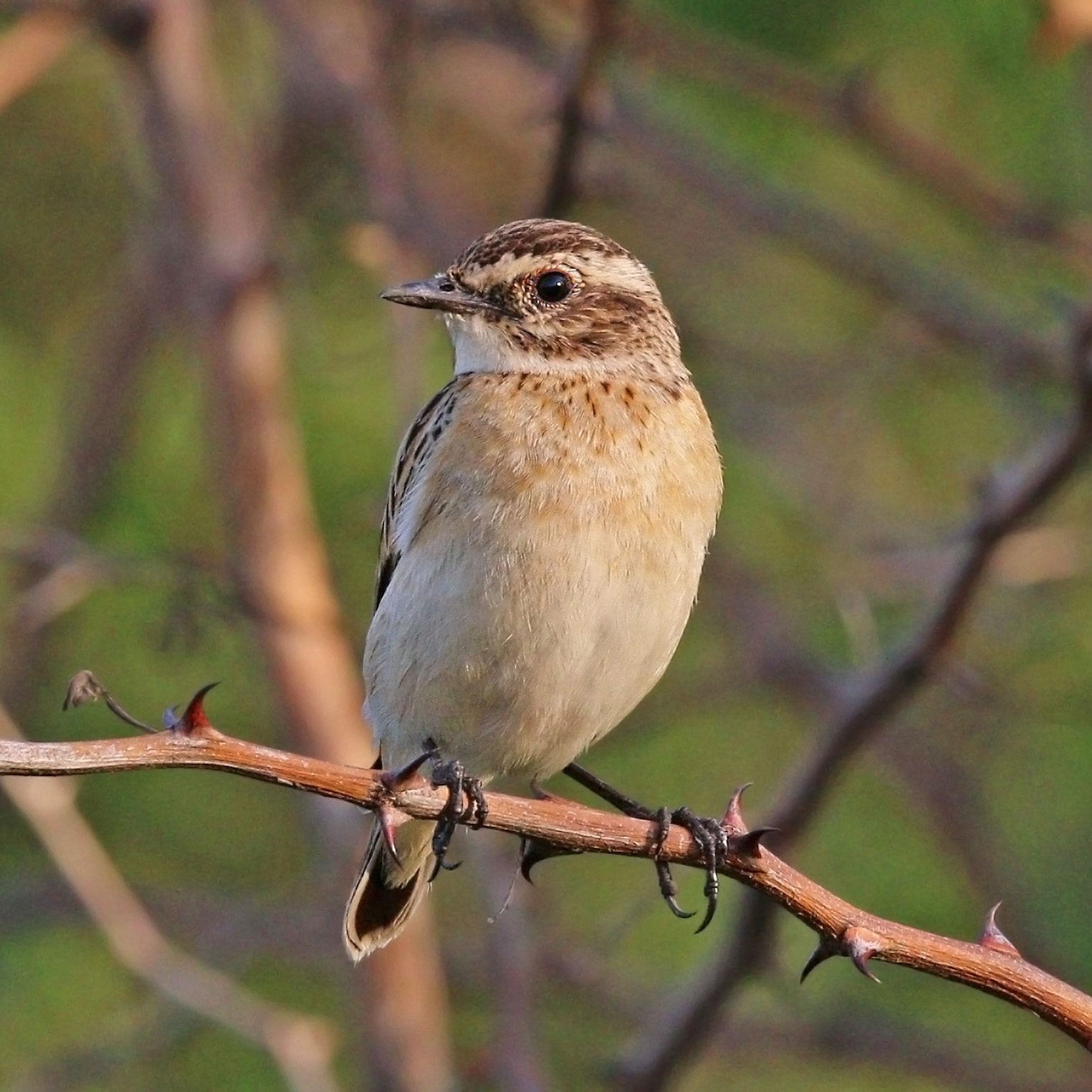
Whinchat

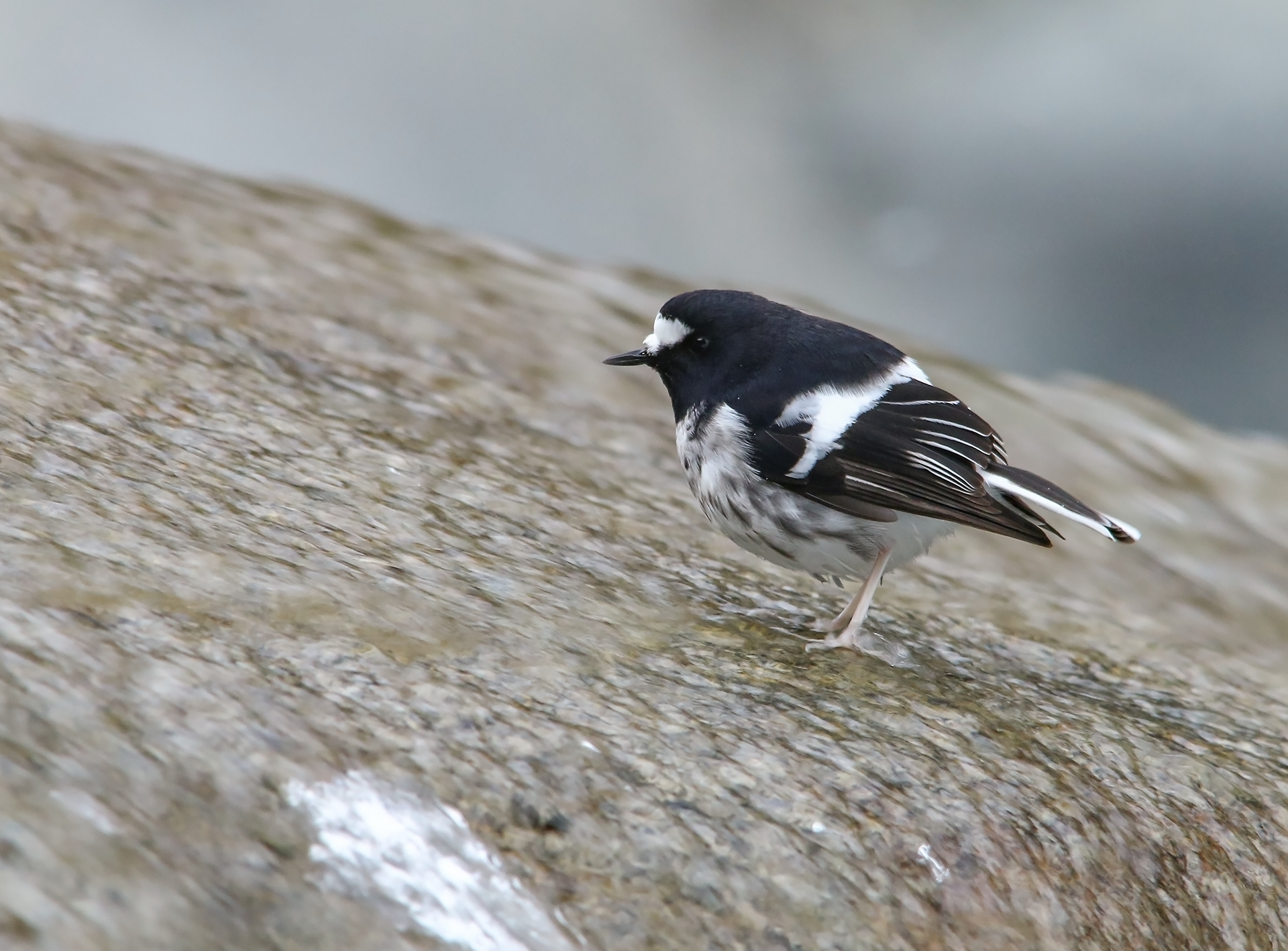
Little forktail

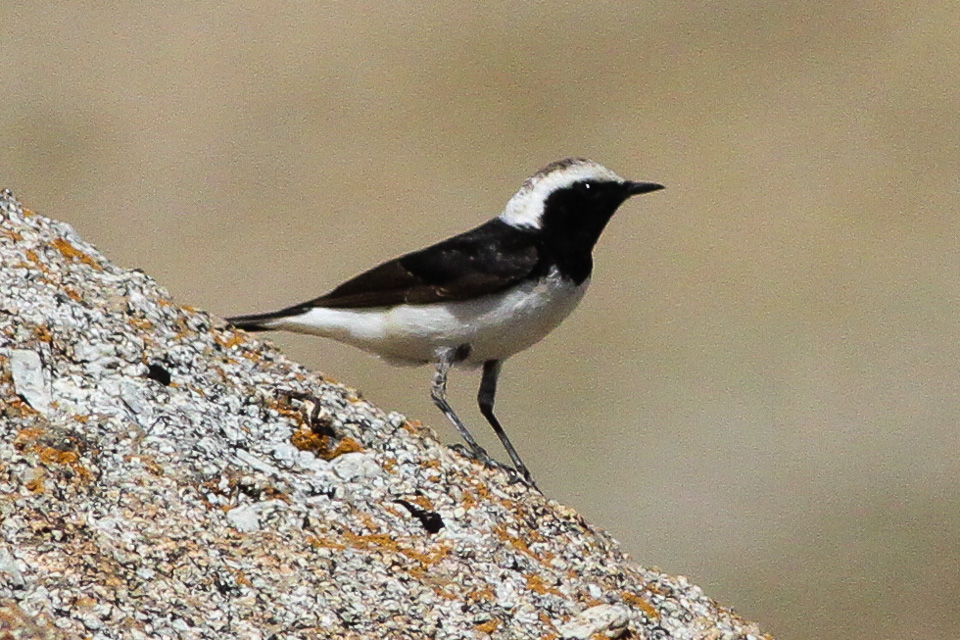
Pied wheatear

Order: Passeriformes Family: Muscicapidae

Old World flycatchers are a large group of small passerine birds native to the Old World. They are mainly small arboreal insectivores. The appearance of these birds is highly varied, but they mostly have weak songs and harsh calls.

- Dark-sided flycatcher, Muscicapa sibirica LC
- Spotted flycatcher, Muscicapa striata LC
- Rufous-tailed scrub robin, Cercotrichas galactotes LC
- Indian robin, Copsychus fulicatus (A) LC
- Oriental magpie-robin, Copsychus saularis (A) LC
- European robin, Erithacus rubecula (A) LC
- Indian blue robin, Larvivora brunnea LC
- White-throated robin, Irania gutturalis LC
- Thrush nightingale, Luscinia luscinia (A) LC
- Common nightingale, Luscinia megarhynchos LC
- Bluethroat, Luscinia svecica LC
- Blue whistling-thrush, Myophonus caeruleus LC
- Little forktail, Enicurus scouleri LC
- Spotted forktail, Enicurus maculatus LC
- Siberian rubythroat, Calliope calliope (A) LC
- Himalayan rubythroat, Calliope pectoralis LC
- Himalayan bluetail, Tarsiger rufilatus LC
- Ultramarine flycatcher, Ficedula superciliaris LC
- Rusty-tailed flycatcher, Ficedula ruficauda LC
- Taiga flycatcher, Ficedula albicilla LC
- Red-breasted flycatcher, Ficedula parva LC
- European pied flycatcher, Ficedula hypoleuca (A) LC
- Blue-fronted redstart, Phoenicurus frontalis LC
- Plumbeous redstart, Phoenicurus fuliginosus LC
- Eversmann's redstart, Phoenicurus erythronota LC
- White-capped redstart, Phoenicurus leucocephalus LC
- Blue-capped redstart, Phoenicurus caeruleocephalus LC
- Common redstart, Phoenicurus phoenicurus LC
- Güldenstädt's redstart, Phoenicurus erythrogaster LC
- Black redstart, Phoenicurus ochruros LC
- Blue-capped rock-thrush, Monticola cinclorhyncha LC
- Common rock thrush, Monticola saxatilis LC
- Blue rock-thrush, Monticola solitarius LC
- Whinchat, Saxicola rubetra (A) LC
- White-browed bushchat, Saxicola macrorhynchus (A) VU
- Siberian stonechat, Saxicola maurus NE
- Pied bush chat, Saxicola caprata LC
- Northern wheatear, Oenanthe oenanthe LC
- Isabelline wheatear, Oenanthe isabellina LC
- Hooded wheatear, Oenanthe monacha LC
- Desert wheatear, Oenanthe deserti LC
- Pied wheatear, Oenanthe pleschanka LC
- Variable wheatear, Oenanthe picata LC
- Hume's wheatear, Oenanthe alboniger LC
- Finsch's wheatear, Oenanthe finschii LC
- Red-tailed wheatear, Oenanthe chrysopygia LC

== Hypocolius ==
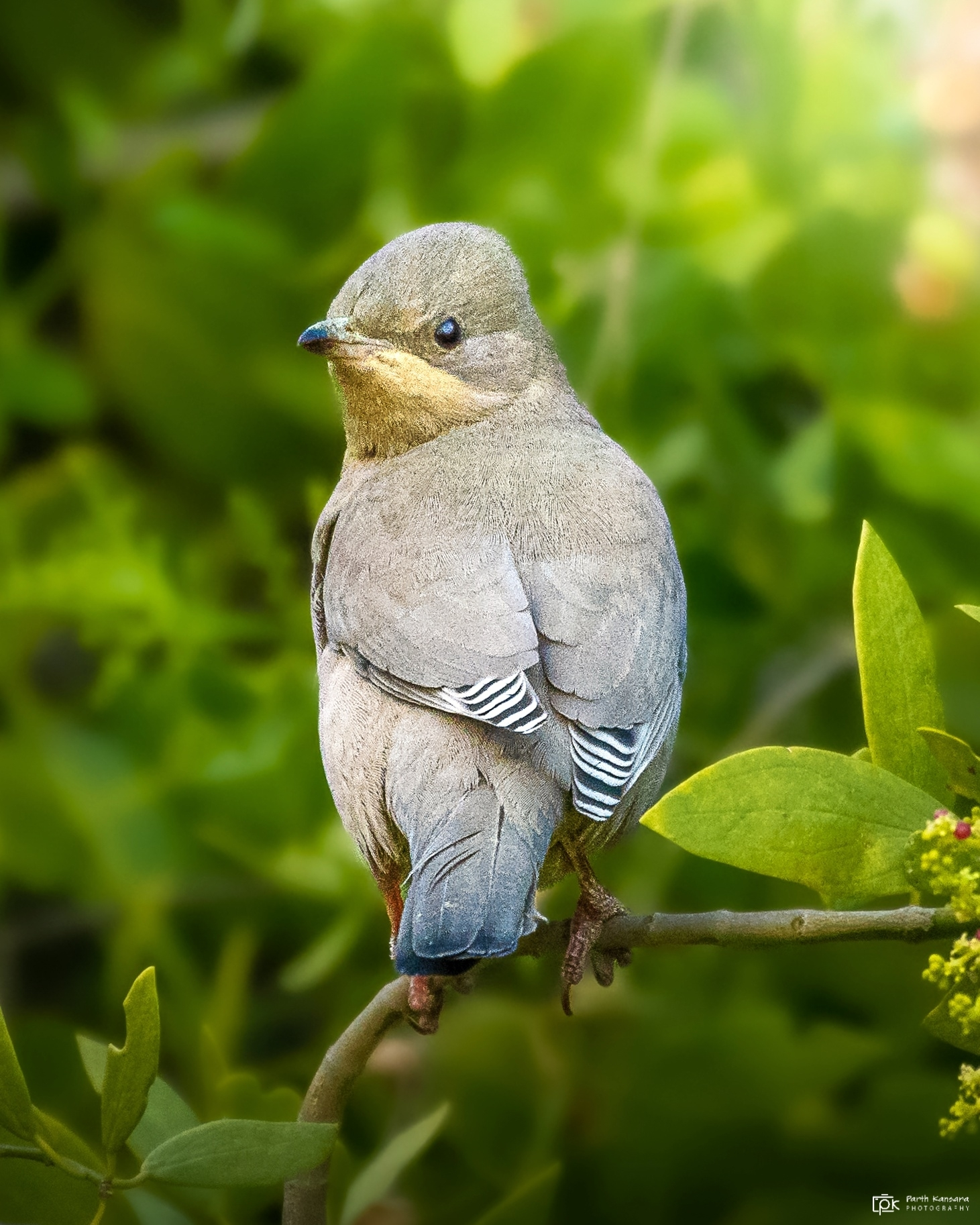
Hypocolius

Order: Passeriformes Family: Hypocoliidae

The grey hypocolius is a small Middle Eastern bird with the shape and soft plumage of a waxwing. They are mainly a uniform grey colour except the males have a black triangular mask around their eyes.

- Grey hypocolius, Hypocolius ampelinus LC

== Sunbirds and spiderhunters ==
Order: Passeriformes Family: Nectariniidae

The sunbirds and spiderhunters are very small passerine birds which feed largely on nectar, although they will also take insects, especially when feeding young. Flight is fast and direct on their short wings. Most species can take nectar by hovering like a hummingbird, but usually perch to feed.

- Purple sunbird, Cinnyris asiaticus LC

== Waxbills and allies ==
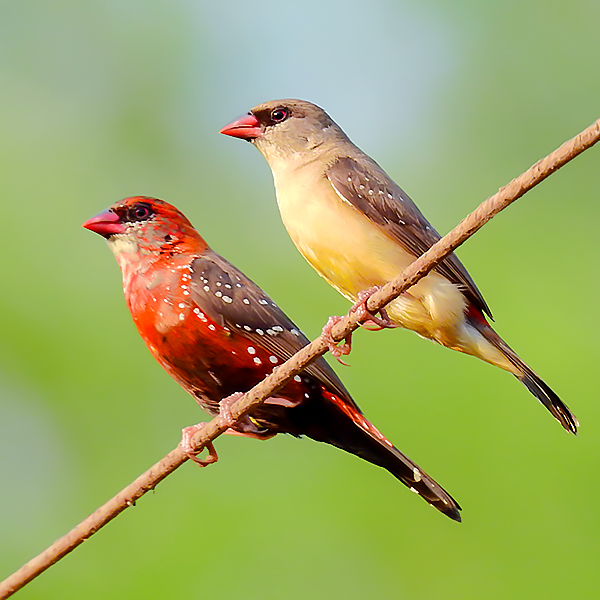
Male and female red avadavat

Order: Passeriformes Family: Estrildidae

The estrildid finches are small passerine birds of the Old World tropics and Australasia. They are gregarious and often colonial seed eaters with short thick but pointed bills. They are all similar in structure and habits, but have wide variation in plumage colours and patterns.

- Red avadavat, Amandava amandava (I) LC
- Scaly-breasted munia, Lonchura punctulata (I) LC

== Accentors ==
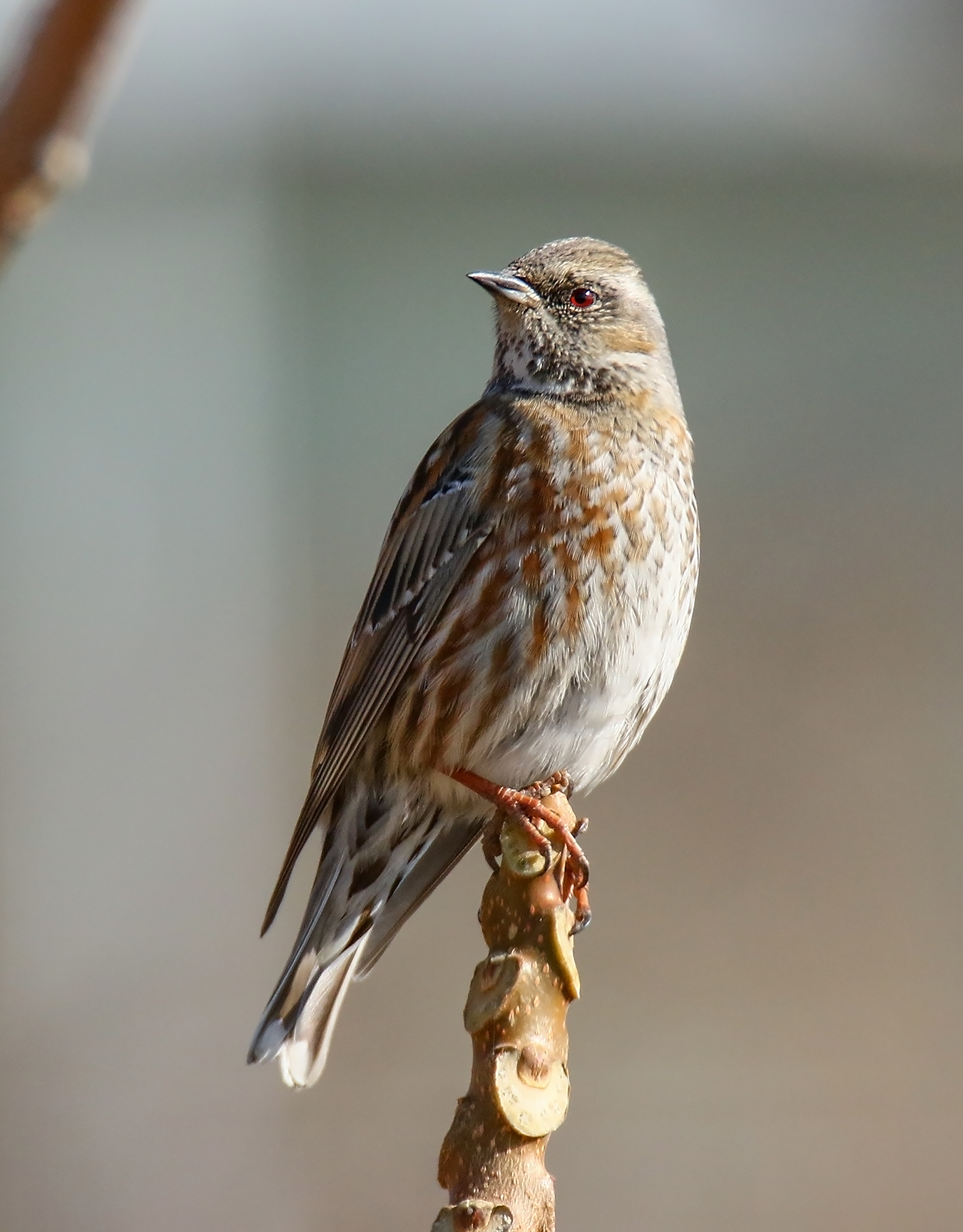
Altai accentor

Order: Passeriformes Family: Prunellidae

The accentors are in the only bird family, Prunellidae, which is completely endemic to the Palearctic. They are small, fairly drab species superficially similar to sparrows.

- Alpine accentor, Prunella collaris LC
- Altai accentor, Prunella himalayana LC
- Rufous-breasted accentor, Prunella strophiata LC
- Radde's accentor, Prunella ocularis (A) LC
- Brown accentor, Prunella fulvescens LC
- Black-throated accentor, Prunella atrogularis LC
- Dunnock, Prunella modularis LC

== Old World sparrows ==
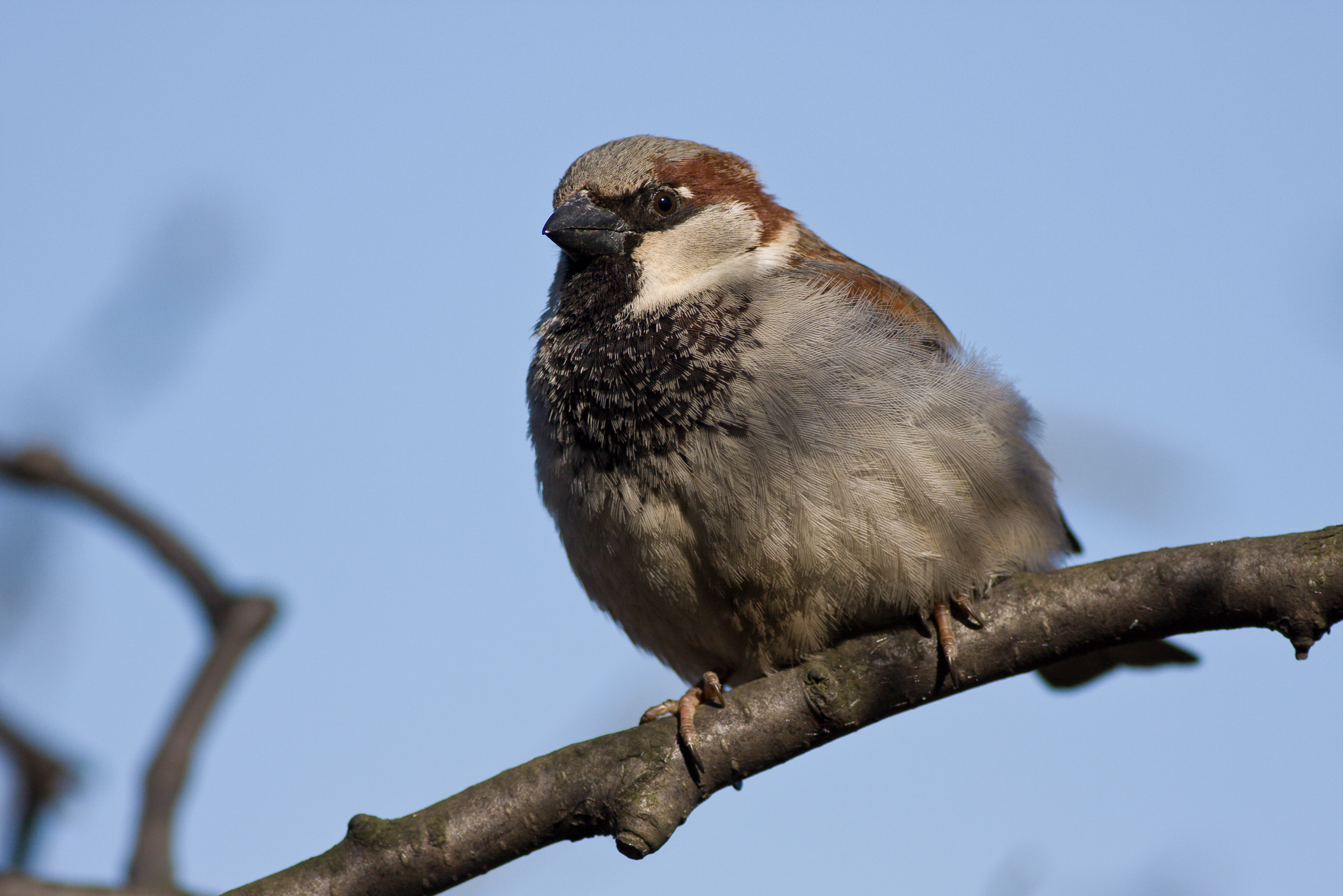
Male house sparrow

Order: Passeriformes Family: Passeridae

Old World sparrows are small passerine birds. In general, sparrows tend to be small, plump, brown or grey birds with short tails and short powerful beaks. Sparrows are seed eaters, but they also consume small insects.

- Saxaul sparrow, Passer ammodendri (A) LC
- House sparrow, Passer domesticus LC
- Spanish sparrow, Passer hispaniolensis LC
- Russet sparrow, Passer cinnamomeus LC
- Dead Sea sparrow, Passer moabiticus LC
- Eurasian tree sparrow, Passer montanus LC
- Yellow-throated sparrow, Gymnoris xanthocollis LC
- Rock sparrow, Petronia petronia LC
- Pale rockfinch, Carpospiza brachydactyla (A) LC
- White-winged snowfinch, Montifringilla nivalis LC
- Afghan snowfinch, Montifringilla theresae LC

== Wagtails and pipits ==
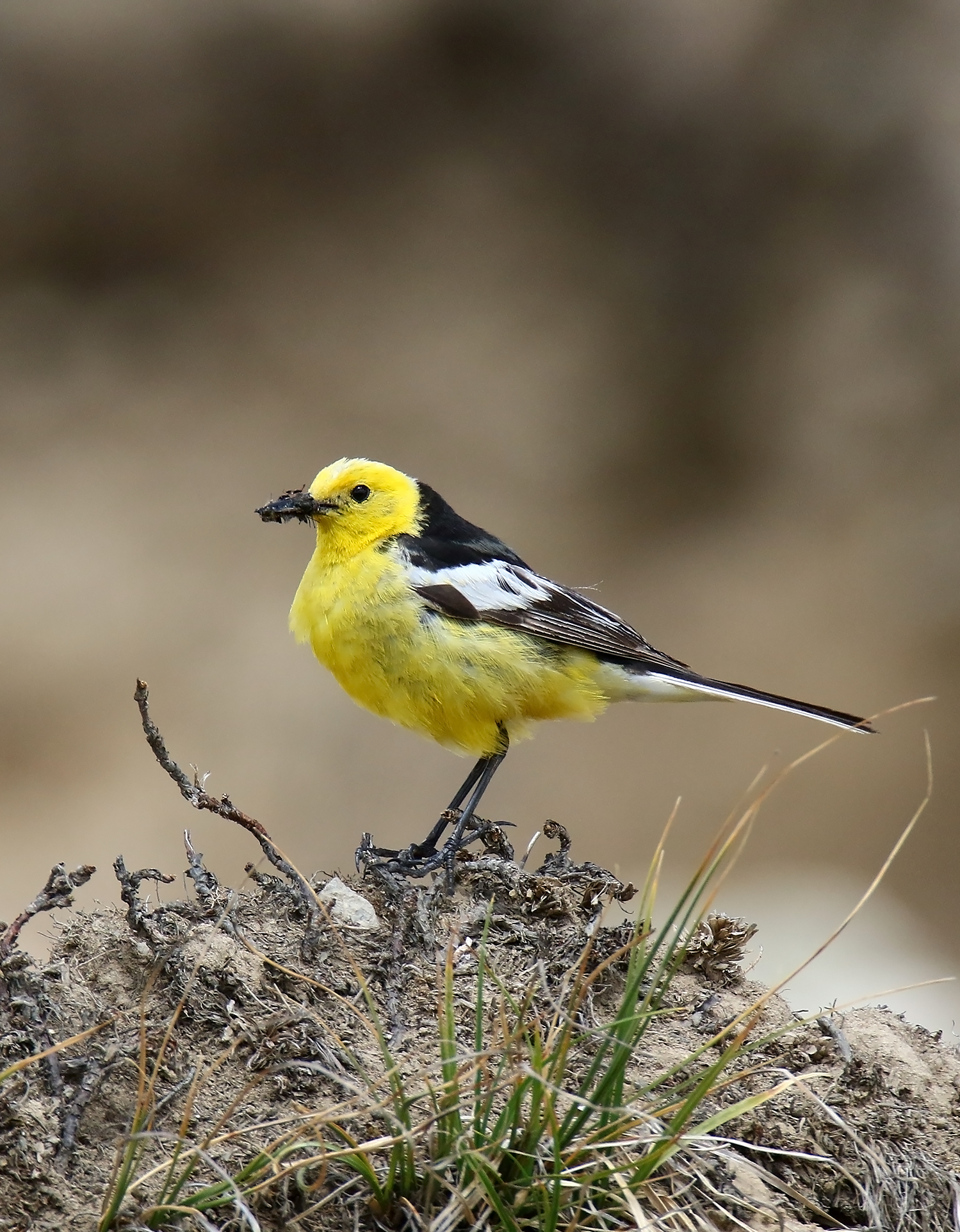
Citrine wagtail

Order: Passeriformes Family: Motacillidae

Motacillidae is a family of small passerine birds with medium to long tails. They include the wagtails, longclaws and pipits. They are slender, ground feeding insectivores of open country.

- Gray wagtail, Motacilla cinerea LC
- Western yellow wagtail, Motacilla flava LC
- Citrine wagtail, Motacilla citreola LC
- White-browed wagtail, Motacilla maderaspatensis LC
- White wagtail, Motacilla alba LC
- Richard's pipit, Anthus richardi LC
- Paddyfield pipit, Anthus rufulus LC
- Long-billed pipit, Anthus similis LC
- Tawny pipit, Anthus campestris LC
- Upland pipit, Anthus sylvanus LC
- Meadow pipit, Anthus pratensis (A) LC
- Rosy pipit, Anthus roseatus LC
- Tree pipit, Anthus trivialis LC
- Olive-backed pipit, Anthus hodgsoni LC
- Red-throated pipit, Anthus cervinus LC
- Water pipit, Anthus spinoletta LC
- Buff-bellied pipit, Anthus rubescens (A) LC

== Finches, euphonias, and allies ==
Order: Passeriformes Family: Fringillidae

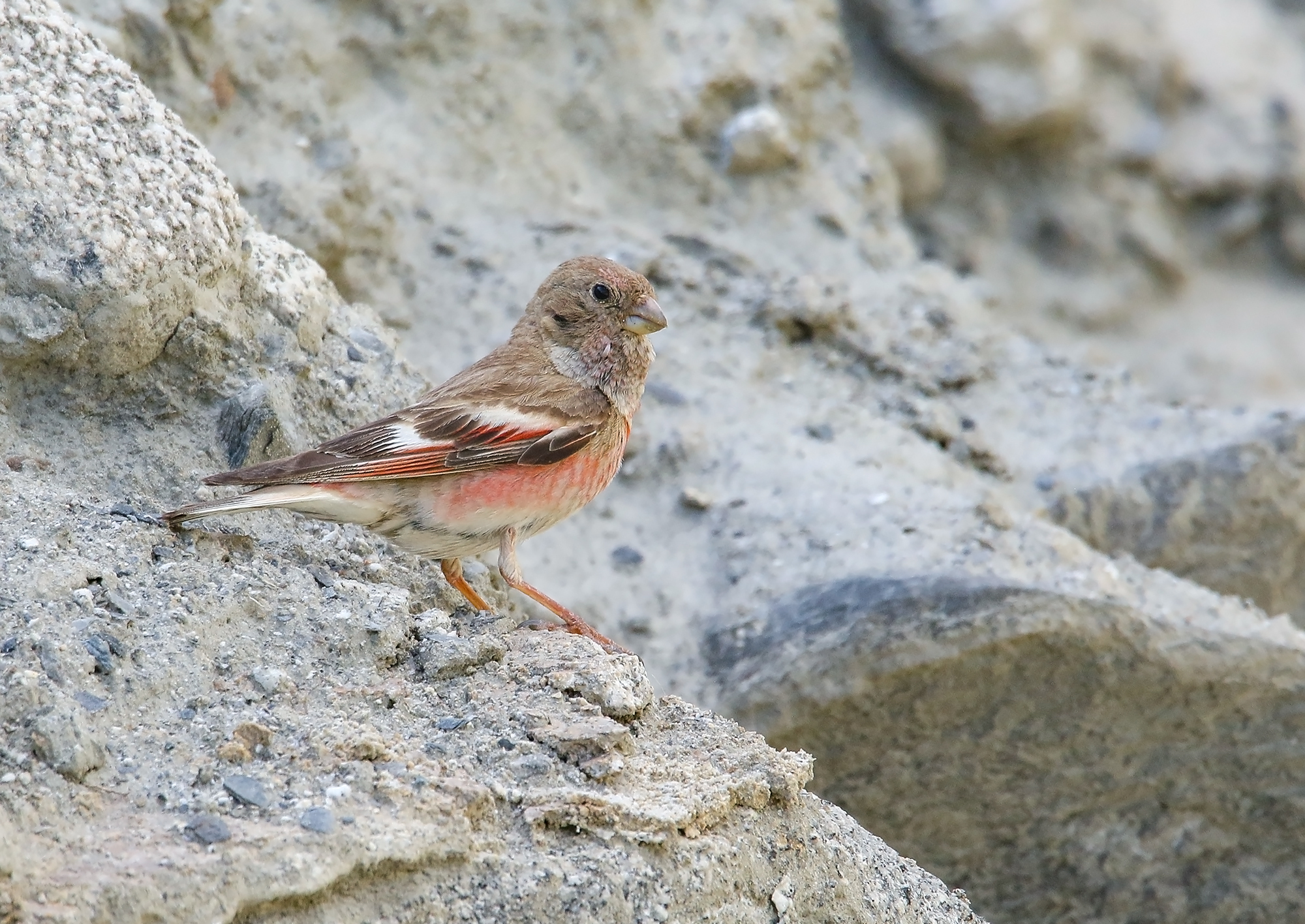
Mongolian finch

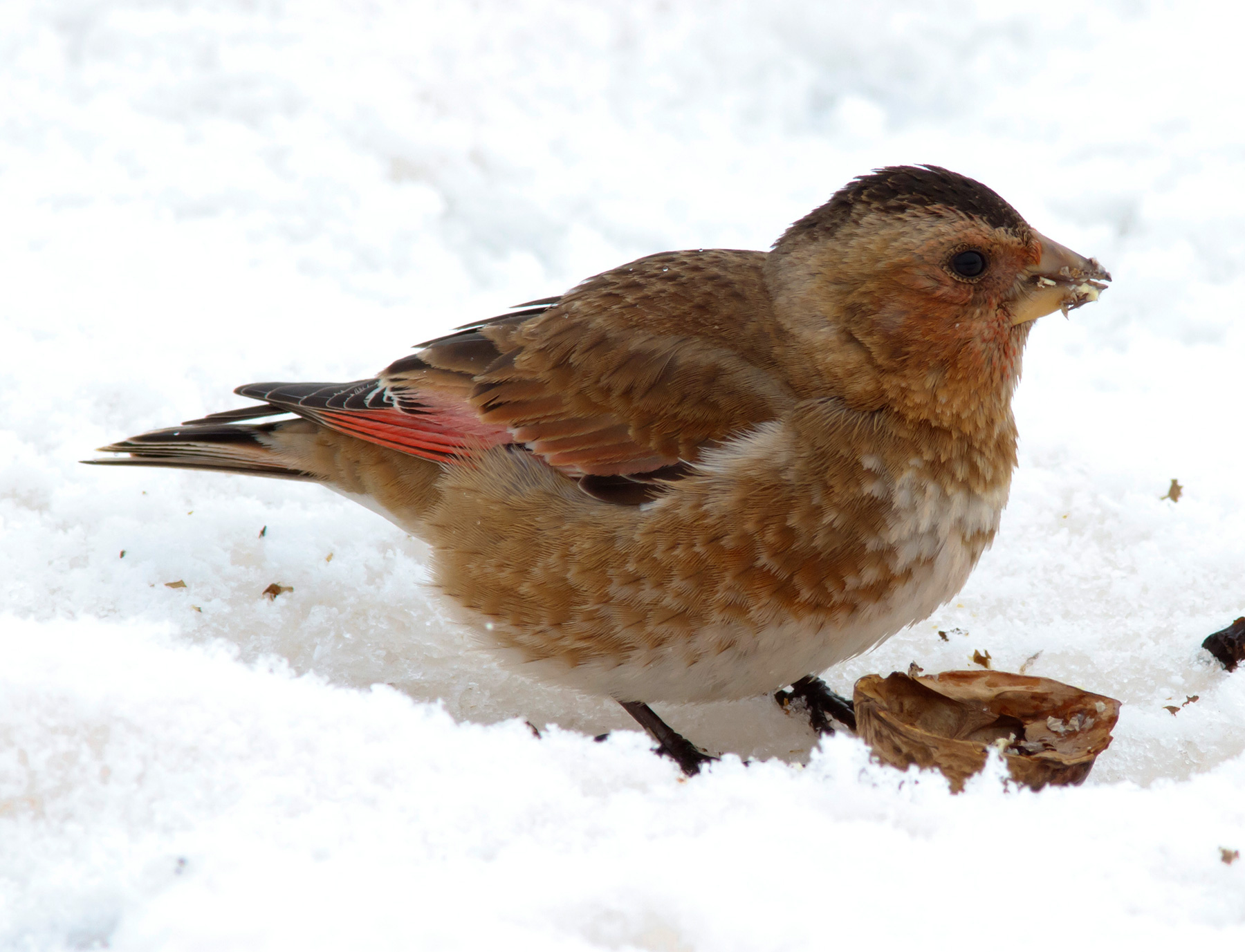
Crimson winged finch

Finches are seed-eating passerine birds, that are small to moderately large and have a strong beak, usually conical and in some species very large. All have twelve tail feathers and nine primaries. These birds have a bouncing flight with alternating bouts of flapping and gliding on closed wings, and most sing well.

- Eurasian chaffinch, Fringilla coelebs LC
- Brambling, Fringilla montifringilla LC
- Black-and-yellow grosbeak, Mycerobas icterioides (A) LC
- White-winged grosbeak, Mycerobas carnipes LC
- Hawfinch, Coccothraustes coccothraustes LC
- Common rosefinch, Carpodacus erythrinus LC
- Blyth's rosefinch, Carpodacus grandis NE
- Pale rosefinch, Carpodacus stoliczkae LC
- Great rosefinch, Carpodacus rubicilla LC
- Himalayan white-browed rosefinch, Carpodacus thura LC
- Eurasian bullfinch, Pyrrhula pyrrhula LC
- Asian crimson-winged finch, Rhodopechys sanguineus LC
- Trumpeter finch, Bucanetes githagineus LC
- Mongolian finch, Bucanetes mongolicus LC
- Plain mountain finch, Leucosticte nemoricola LC
- Brandt's mountain finch, Leucosticte brandti LC
- Desert finch, Rhodospiza obsoleta LC
- European greenfinch, Chloris chloris LC
- Twite, Linaria flavirostris LC
- Common linnet, Linaria cannabina LC
- Red crossbill, Loxia curvirostra (A) LC
- European goldfinch, Carduelis carduelis LC
- Red-fronted serin, Serinus pusillus LC
- Eurasian siskin, Spinus spinus (A) LC

== Old World buntings ==
Order: Passeriformes Family: Emberizidae

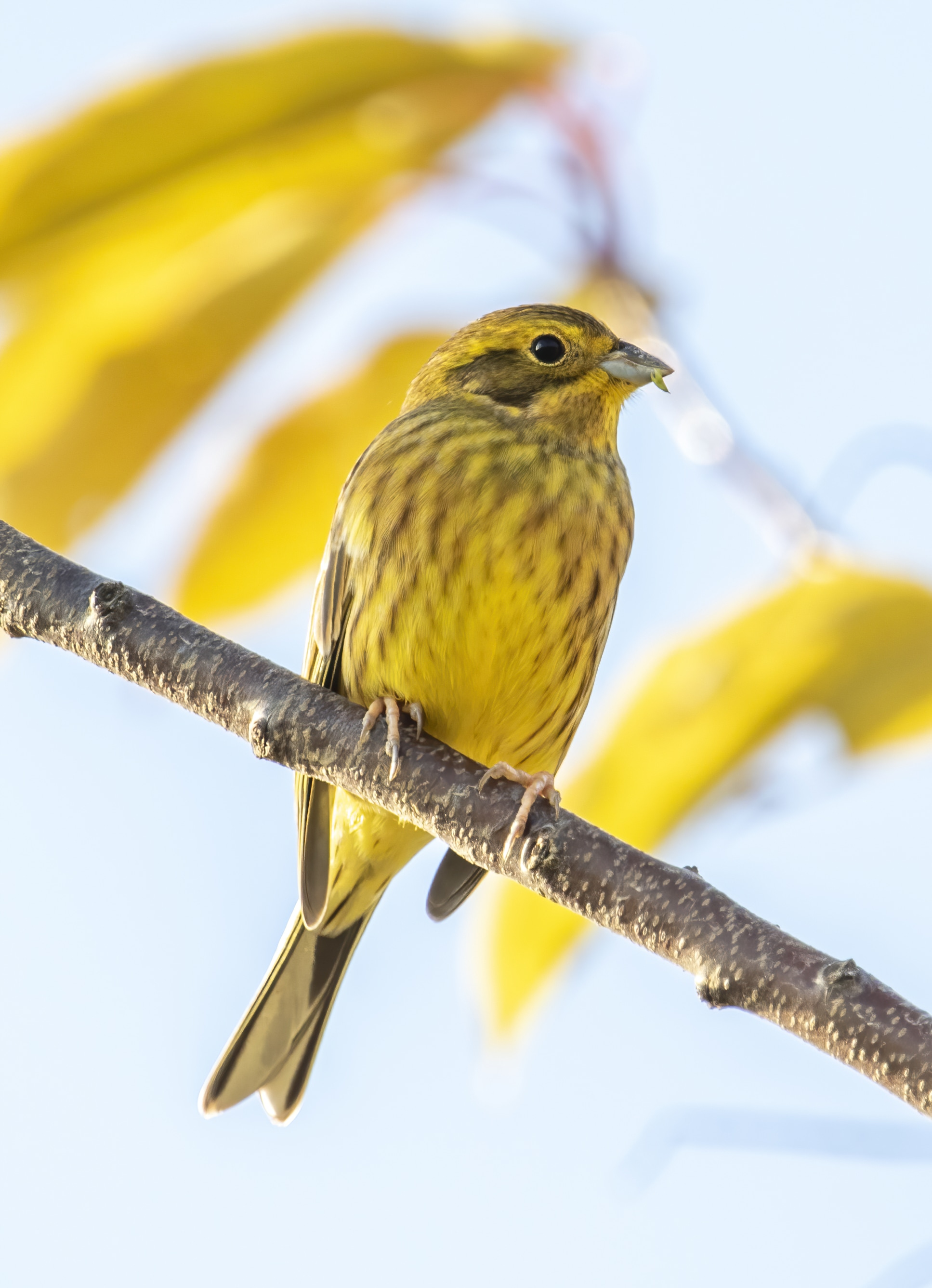
Yellowhammer

The emberizids are a large family of passerine birds. They are seed-eating birds with distinctively shaped bills. Many emberizid species have distinctive head patterns.

- Black-headed bunting, Emberiza melanocephala (A) LC
- Red-headed bunting, Emberiza bruniceps LC
- Corn bunting, Emberiza calandra LC
- Chestnut-eared bunting, Emberiza fucata (A) LC
- Rock bunting, Emberiza cia LC
- White-capped bunting, Emberiza stewarti LC
- Yellowhammer, Emberiza citrinella (A) LC
- Pine bunting, Emberiza leucocephalos LC
- Gray-necked bunting, Emberiza buchanani LC
- Ortolan, Emberiza hortulana LC
- Striolated bunting, Emberiza striolata LC
- Common reed bunting, Emberiza schoeniclus LC
- Little bunting, Emberiza pusilla LC
- Rustic bunting, Emberiza rustica VU

== See also ==
- List of birds
- Lists of birds by region
