= Grey-hooded bunting =

Grey-hooded bunting may refer to two different species of birds:

- Chestnut-eared bunting, found from northern Pakistan to Korea and Japan
- Grey-necked bunting, found from eastern Turkey to north-western China
