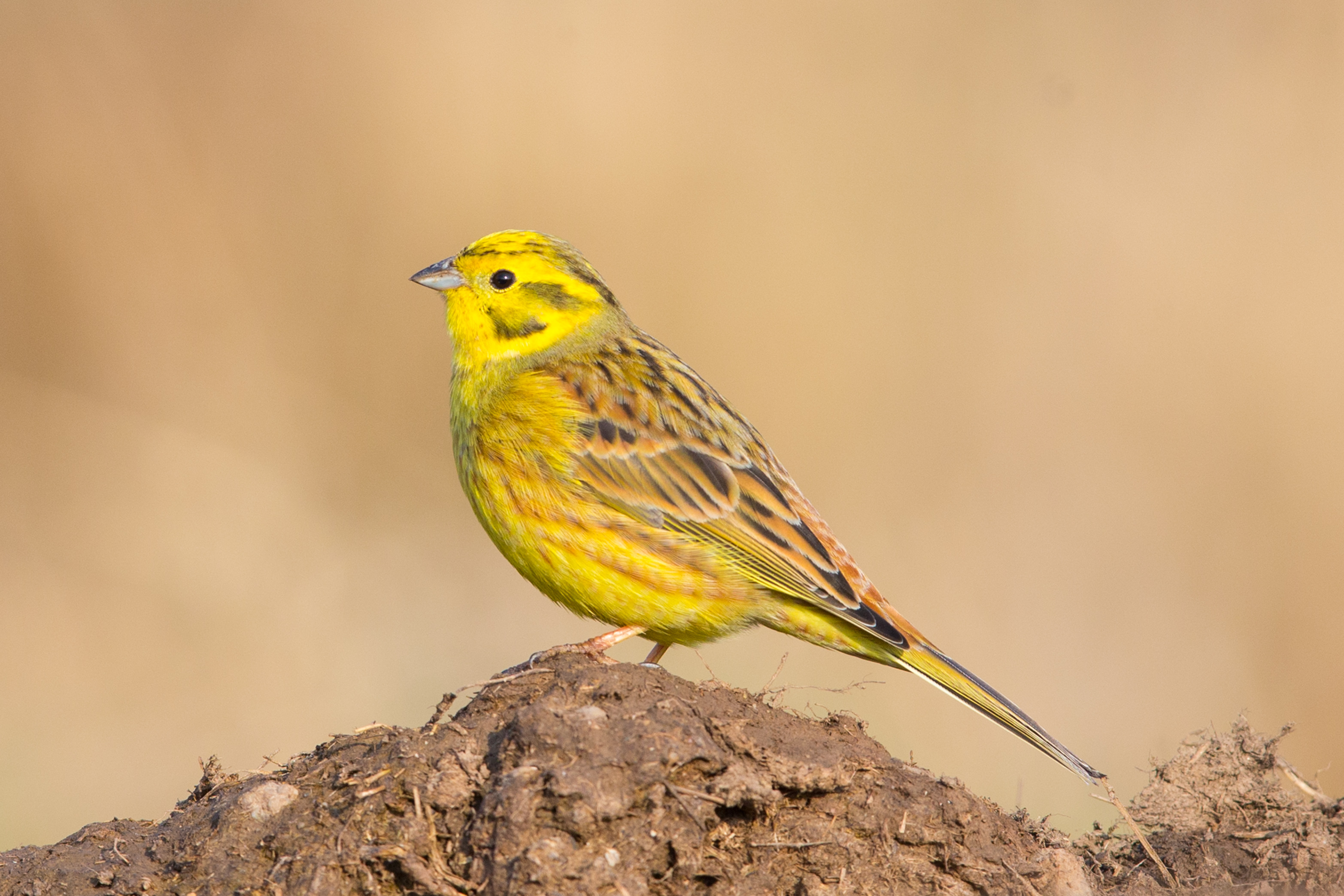
- Male E. c. citrinella

Conservation status
- Least Concern (IUCN 3.1)

Scientific classification
- Kingdom: Animalia
- Phylum: Chordata
- Class: Aves
- Order: Passeriformes
- Family: Emberizidae
- Genus: Emberiza
- Species: E. citrinella

Binomial name
- Emberiza citrinella Linnaeus, 1758
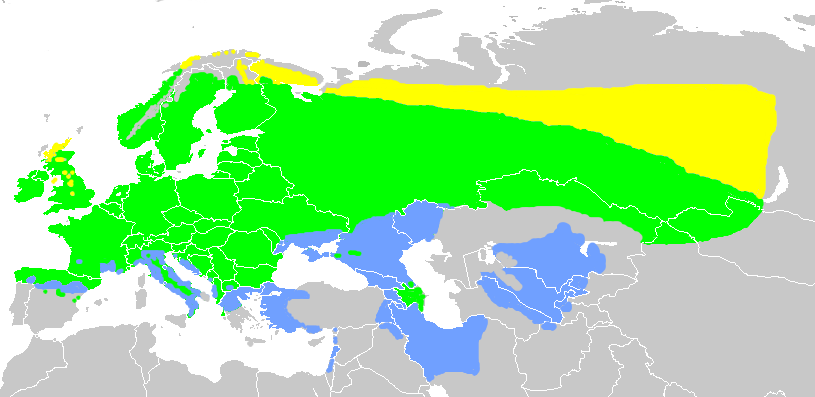
- Breeding summer visitor Resident year-round Winter visitor Approximate natural range

Audio
- Song recorded in Devon, England

= Yellowhammer =

Passerine bird in the bunting family that is native to Eurasia

Emberiza citrinella

The yellowhammer (Emberiza citrinella) is a passerine bird in the bunting family that is native to Eurasia and has been introduced to New Zealand and Australia. Most European birds remain in the breeding range year-round, but the eastern subspecies is partially migratory, with much of the population wintering further south. The male yellowhammer has a bright yellow head, streaked brown back, chestnut rump, and yellow under parts. Other plumages are duller versions of the same pattern. The yellowhammer is common in open areas with some shrubs or trees, and forms small flocks in winter. Its song has a rhythm like "A little bit of bread and no cheese". The song is very similar to that of its closest relative, the pine bunting, with which it interbreeds.

Breeding commences mainly in April and May, with the female building a lined cup nest in a concealed location on or near the ground. The three to five eggs are patterned with a mesh of fine dark lines, giving rise to the old name for the bird of "scribble lark" or "writing lark". The female incubates the eggs for 12–14 days prior to hatching, and broods the altricial downy chicks until they fledge 11–13 days later. Both adults feed the chicks in the nest and raise two or three broods each year. The nest may be raided by rodents or corvids, and the adults are hunted by birds of prey. Yellowhammers feed on the ground, usually in flocks outside the breeding season. Their diet is mainly seeds, supplemented by invertebrates in the breeding season. Changes to agricultural practices have led to population declines in western Europe, but its large numbers and huge range mean that the yellowhammer is classed as being of least concern by the International Union for Conservation of Nature.

This conspicuous yellow bird has inspired poems by Robert Burns and John Clare, and its characteristic song has influenced musical works by Beethoven and Messiaen. Children's writer Enid Blyton helped to popularise the standard English representation of the song.

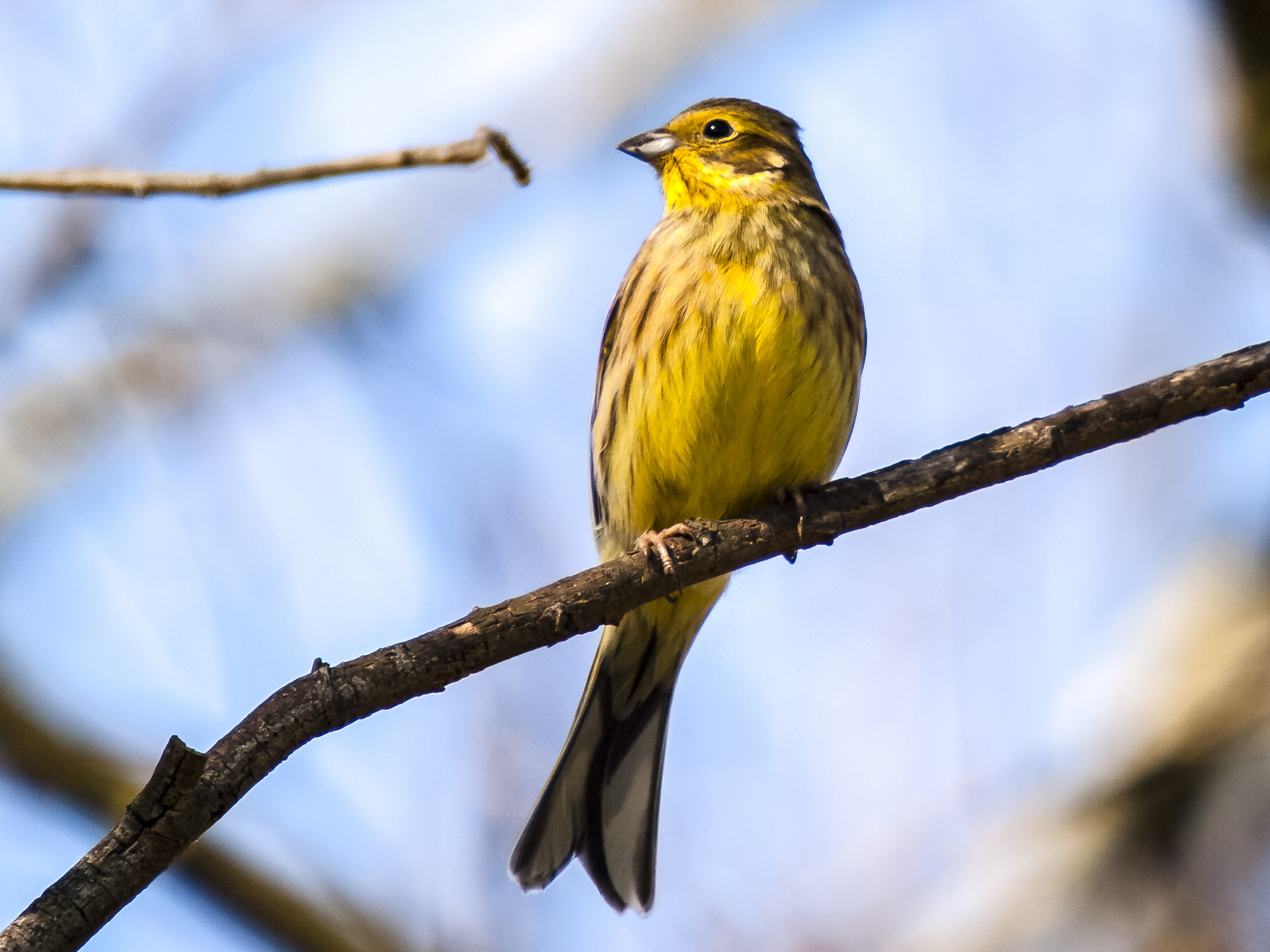
Yellowhammer

== Taxonomy ==
The yellowhammer was described by Carl Linnaeus in his landmark 1758 10th edition of Systema Naturae under its current scientific name. Emberiza is derived from the Old German Embritz, a bunting, and citrinella is the Italian for a small yellow bird. The English name is thought to have come from Ammer, another German word for a bunting, and was first recorded in 1553 as yelambre.

Within its genus, Emberiza, the yellowhammer is most closely related to the pine bunting, with which it forms a superspecies; they have at times been considered as one species. The white-capped and cirl buntings are also near relatives of the species pair. Where their ranges meet, the yellowhammer and pine bunting interbreed; the yellowhammer is dominant, and the hybrid zone is moving further east.

=== Subspecies ===
There are currently 3 recognised subspecies of yellowhammer:

- E. c. citrinella (Linnaeus, 1758), the nominate subspecies, which occurs in southeast England and most of Europe east to the northwestern corner of Russia and western Ukraine.
- E. c. caliginosa (Clancey, 1940) is the form found in Ireland, the Isle of Man, and Great Britain (except southeast England).
- E. c. erythrogenys (Brehm, 1855) breeds from Russia, central Ukraine and the eastern Balkans eastwards to Siberia and northwest Mongolia, and also has isolated populations to the east of the Black Sea and in the Caucasus.

== Description ==
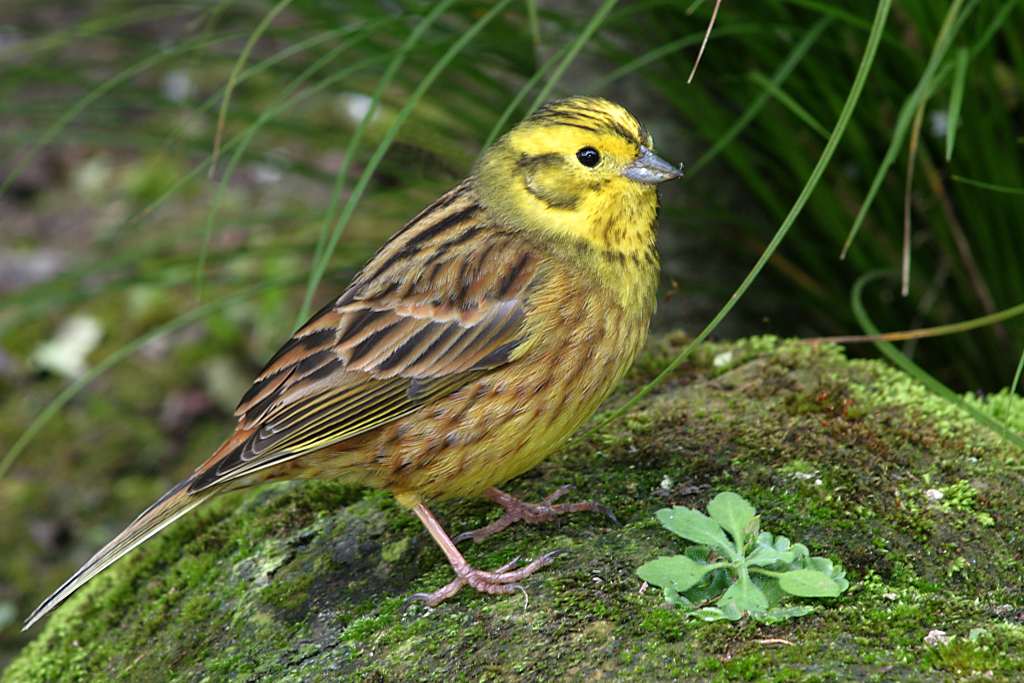
Male E. c. caliginosa

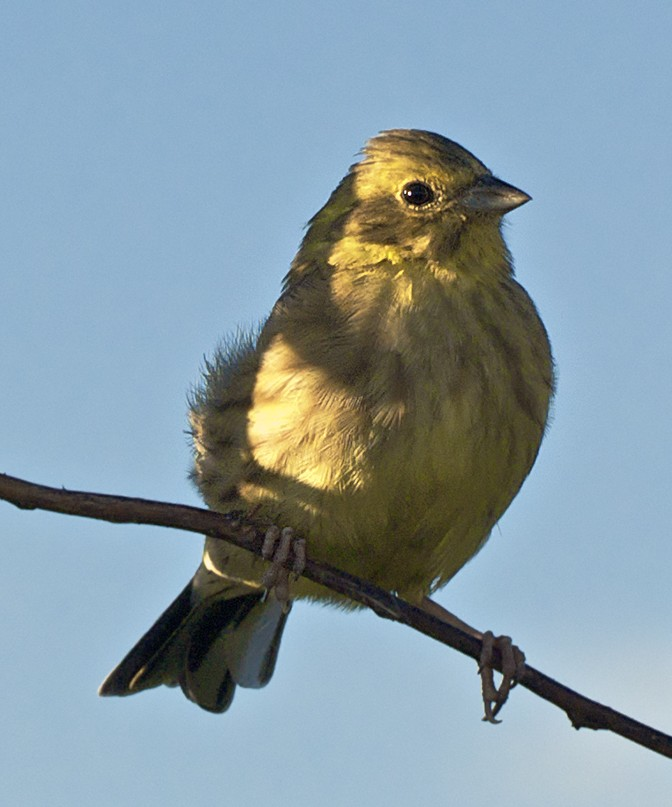
Female

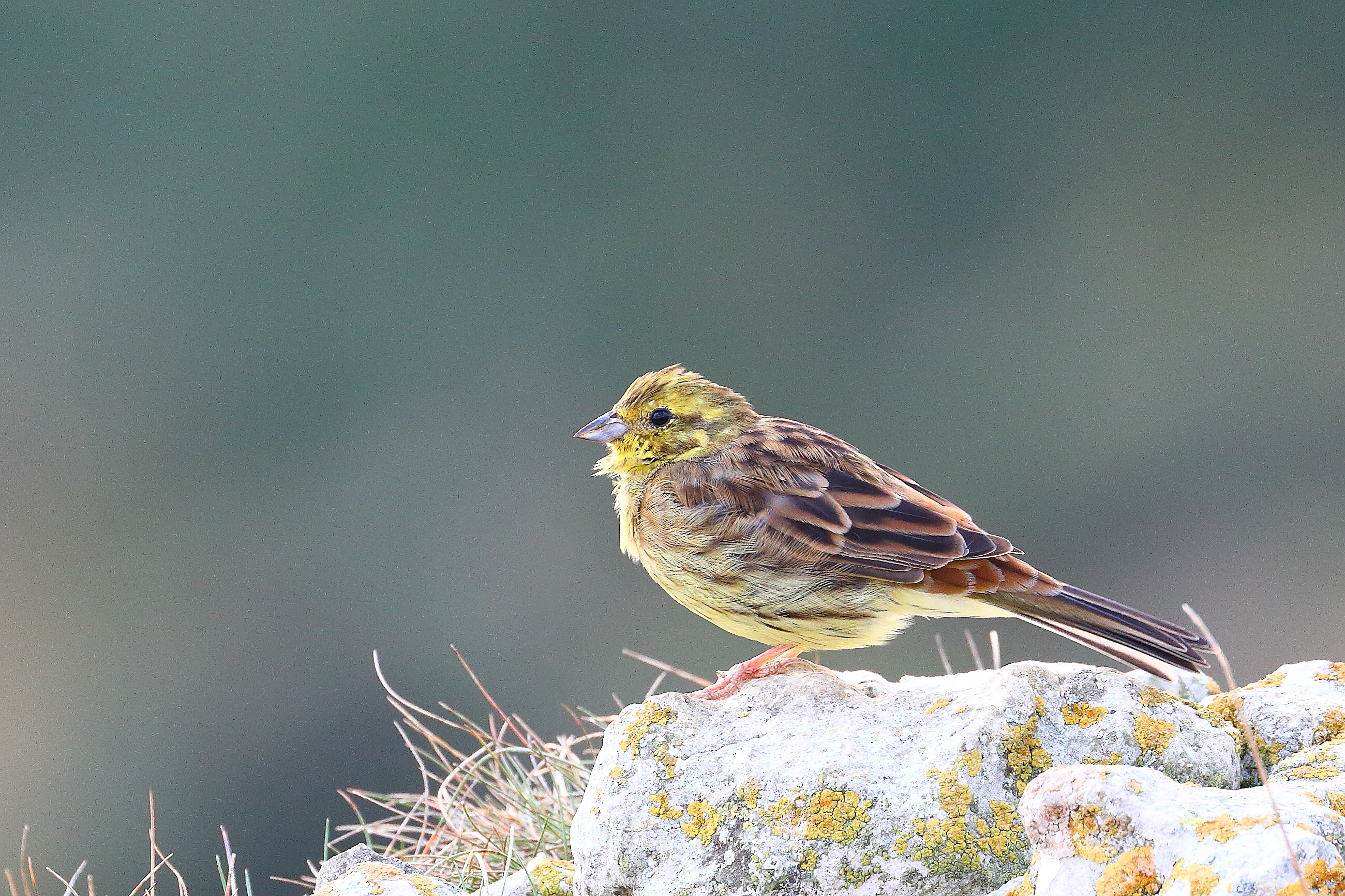
Emberiza citrinella

The yellowhammer is a large bunting, 16–16.5 cm (6.3–6.5 in) long, with a 23–29.5 cm (9.1–11.6 in) wingspan; it weighs 20–36.5 g (0.71–1.29 oz). The male of the nominate subspecies E. c. citrinella has a bright yellow head, heavily streaked brown back, rufous rump, yellow under parts, and white outer tail feathers. The female is less brightly coloured, and more streaked on the crown, breast, and flanks. Both sexes are less strongly marked outside the breeding season, when the dark fringes on new feathers obscure the yellow plumage. The juvenile is much duller and less yellow than the adults, and often has a paler rump.

After breeding, adults have a complete moult, which takes at least eight weeks; males acquire more yellow in the plumage each time they moult. Juveniles have a partial moult not long after fledging, replacing the head, body, and some covert feathers.

Differences between the subspecies are small and geographically gradual. On average, the male of E. c. caliginosa is slightly smaller and darker than the same sex of the nominate subspecies, and also has more streaking on its back, a greenish tint to the yellow of the head and more chestnut on the flanks. The male of the eastern form, E. c. erythrogenys, is paler and less streaked than E. c. citrinella. Its flanks, undertail and wing bars are usually whiter, and its crown and throat are brighter yellow. Distinguishing females of the three subspecies using plumage features is not usually possible.

Females and juveniles, especially of the pale eastern subspecies, E. c. erythrogenys, may be confused with pine buntings, but they always have a yellow tint to their plumage, a paler rufous rump, and more uniform upperparts than that species. Young and female yellowhammers can be distinguished from cirl buntings by the grey-brown rump of the latter species. Male hybrids with pine buntings are typically white-faced and have some yellow on the head, under parts or flight feathers, but females are usually indistinguishable from yellowhammers.

=== Voice ===
The song of the cock yellowhammer is a series of short notes, gradually increasing in volume and followed by one or two more protracted notes. It is often represented as "A little bit of bread and no cheese", and the full version can be confused with the almost identical song of the pine bunting. If the final notes are omitted, confusion with the cirl bunting is possible. Other vocalisations include a zit contact call, a see alarm, and a trilled tirrr given in flight.

Yellowhammer males learn their songs from their fathers, and over time, regional dialects have developed, with minor differences to the conclusion of the basic song; all are mutually recognised by birds from different areas. Each male has an individual repertoire of song variants within its regional dialect; females tend to mate with males that share their dialect, and prefer those with the largest repertoires.

The pine bunting and yellowhammer are so closely related that each responds to the other's song. The male yellowhammer's song is more attractive to females, and is one reason for the dominance of that species where the ranges overlap.

== Distribution and habitat ==
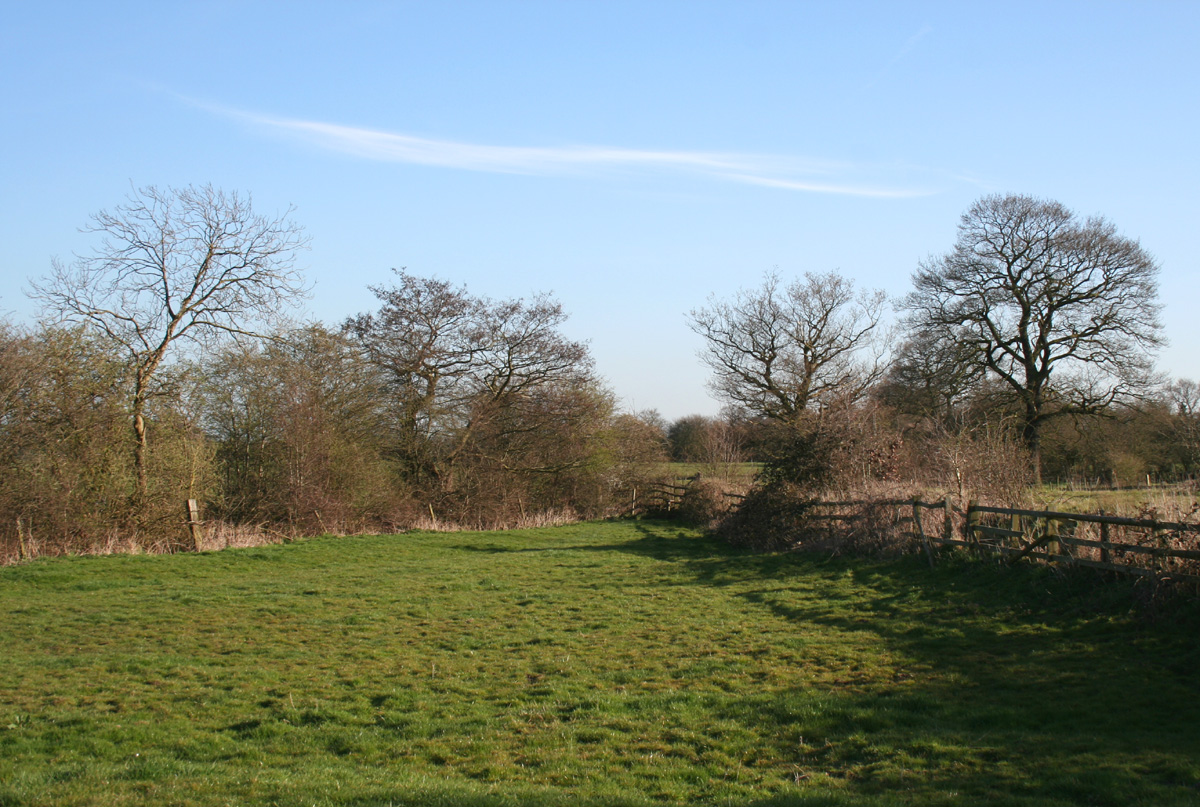
Traditional farmland provides good habitat for nesting and feeding.

The yellowhammer breeds across the Palearctic between the 16–20 °C (61–68 °F) July isotherms. It is the commonest and most widespread European bunting, although it is absent from high mountains, Arctic regions, the western Netherlands, most of Iberia and Greece, and low-lying regions of other countries adjoining the Mediterranean Sea. It breeds in Russia east to Irkutsk, and in most of Ukraine. The Asian range extends into northwest Turkey, the Caucasus, and northern Kazakhstan.

Most European yellowhammers winter within their breeding range, only the far north being vacated, although some birds move south of their breeding range in Spain, Italy, and other Mediterranean countries. Distances travelled can be up to 500 km (310 mi) for northern birds. Asian birds are more strongly migratory, deserting much of the north to winter in Iraq, Iran, and southern Central Asia. The yellowhammer has occurred as a vagrant in the United Arab Emirates, Egypt, Kuwait, Morocco, Malta, the Himalayas (winter vagrant from northern Afghanistan to central Nepal), the Balearic Islands, Iceland, and the Faroes.

Yellowhammers of the British and Irish race, E. c. caliginosa, were introduced to New Zealand by local acclimatisation societies in 1862, and soon spread over the main islands. They sometimes visit New Zealand's subantarctic islands, although rarely staying to breed, and have reached Australia's Lord Howe Island on a number of occasions. At the beginning of the 20th century, this bunting was seen as a serious agricultural pest in its adopted country.

Populations of yellowhammer have also been introduced to the Falkland Islands and South Africa.

The yellowhammer is a bird of dry, open country, preferably with a range of vegetation types and some trees from which to sing. It is absent from urban areas, forests, and wetlands. Probably originally found at forest edges and large clearing, it has benefited from traditional agriculture, which created extensive open areas with hedges and clumps of trees.

== Behaviour ==
=== Breeding ===
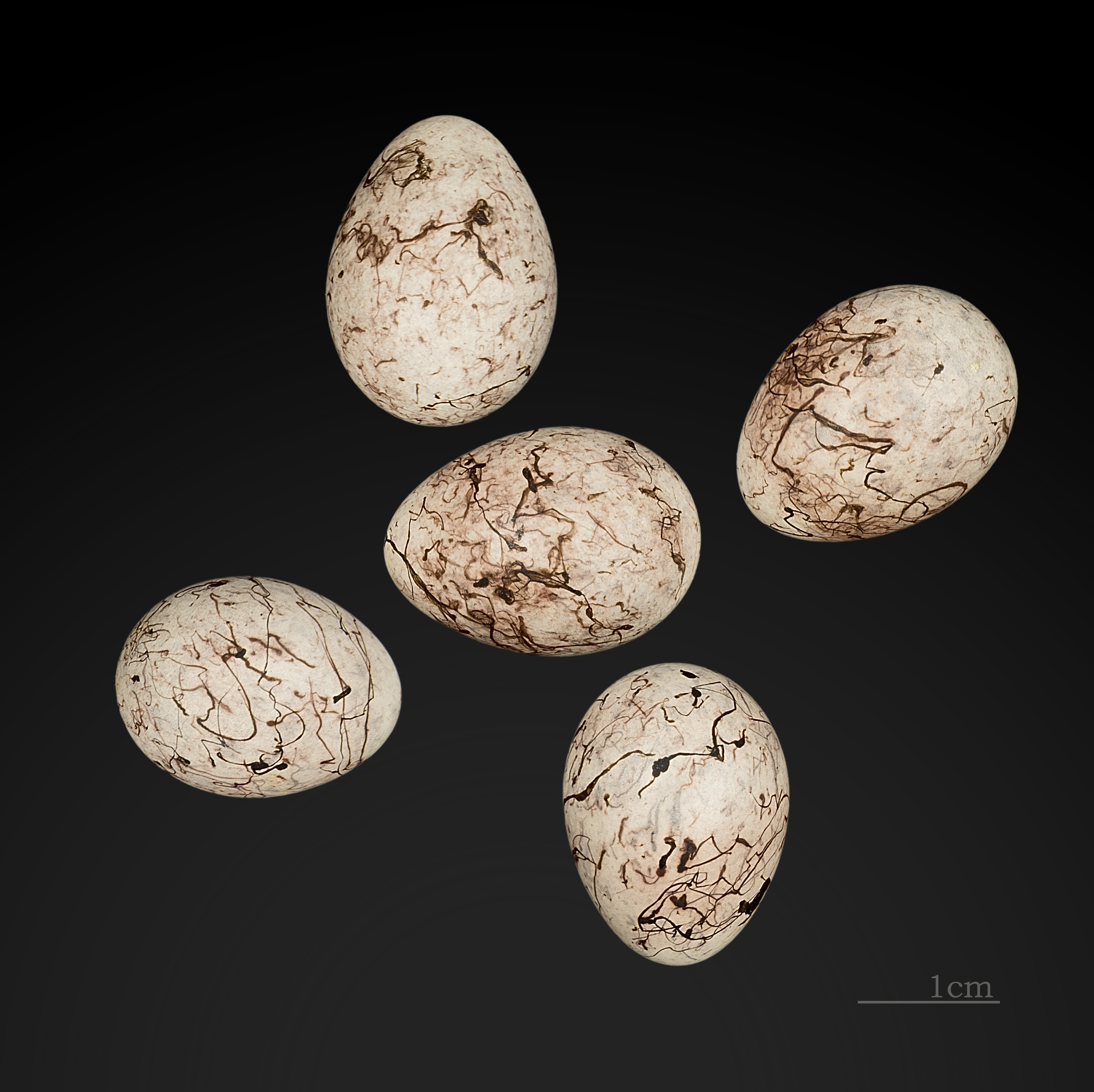
Eggs

Breeding normally starts in early May, but often in April in the south of the range. Yellowhammers are monogamous and breed when aged one year. The males establish territories along hedges or woodland fringes and sing from a tree or bush, often continuing well into July or August. The male displays to the female by raising his wings and running towards her. The nest is built by the female on or near the ground, and is typically well hidden in tussocks, against a bank or low in a bush. It is constructed from nearby plant material, such as leaves, dry grass, and stalks, and is lined with fine grasses and sometimes animal hair. It is 11.5–13 cm (4.5–5.1 in) across with a cup 4–4.5 cm (1.6–1.8 in) deep.

The clutch is usually three to five whitish eggs, typically patterned with a network of fine, dark lines. The eggs average 21 mm × 16 mm (0.83 in × 0.63 in) in size and weigh 2.9 g (0.10 oz), of which 6% is shell. The female incubates the eggs for 12–14 days to hatching, and broods the altricial, downy chicks until they fledge 11–13 days later. Both adults feed the chicks in the nest and two or three broods are raised each year.

The adult annual survival rate in the UK is around 54%, and that for juveniles in their first year is 53%. The typical lifespan is three years, although records from Great Britain and Germany indicate birds surviving more than 13 years.

=== Feeding ===
Foraging is mainly on the ground, and the bird's diet consists mainly of seeds. Oily seeds, such as those of brassicas, are ignored in favour of more starchy items. Typical food plants include common nettle, docks, common knotgrass, fat hen, common chickweed, and yarrow. Grasses are also important, particularly cereals, and grain makes up a significant part of the food consumed in autumn and winter, wheat and oats being preferred to barley. When not breeding, yellowhammers forage in flocks that can occasionally number hundreds of birds, and often contain other buntings and finches.

The yellowhammer adds invertebrates to its diet in the breeding season, particularly as food for its growing chicks. A wide range of species is taken, including springtails, grasshoppers, flies, beetles, caterpillars, earthworms, spiders, and snails. During the first few days, chicks are exclusively fed invertebrate prey, but from day three they are also fed cereal grains, which the chicks can digest efficiently. This is thought to be intentional by the parents to allow the nestlings to adjust their physiology to eating seed.

== Predators and parasites ==
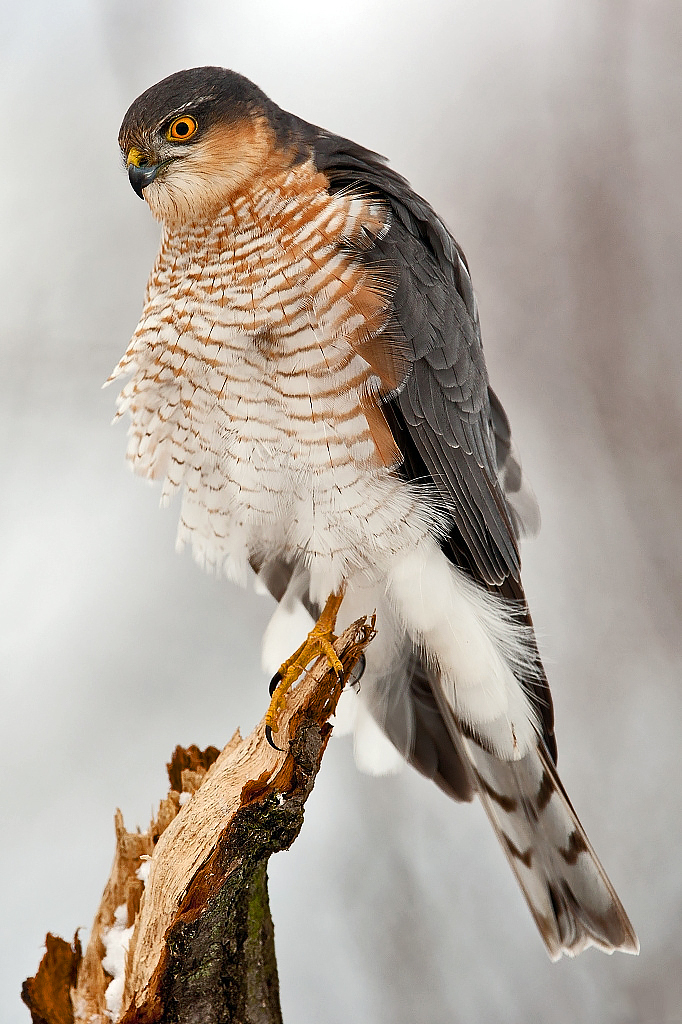
The Eurasian sparrowhawk is a predator of the yellowhammer.

Predators of the yellowhammer include the sparrowhawk, Eurasian goshawk, lesser spotted eagle, and Eurasian hobby. It is not a significant host of the common cuckoo, a brood parasite, although as a ground-nesting bird, its eggs and chicks are vulnerable to predation from small mammals such as mice and other rodents. Nests are also raided by crows, Eurasian jays, and Eurasian magpies. Predation accounted for more than 60% of nest failures in a 2012 survey in Germany.

Thirteen species of fleas in the genera Ceratophyllus and Dasypsyllus have been found on this bunting, and internal parasites include Ascaridia galli. The yellowhammer may carry haematozoan blood parasites such as Haemoproteus coatneyi. Males with high parasite levels produced fewer offspring (there is no such effect for females), and tend to be less brightly coloured. The striking plumage of the male may therefore have arisen as a signal of fitness to breed. Yellowhammers infected with Haemoproteus may have lower winter survival rates due to a tendency to having shorter wings.

== Status and conservation ==
The International Union for Conservation of Nature estimates the European population of the yellowhammer to be from 54–93 million individuals, suggesting a Eurasian total of 73–186 million birds. Although the population appears to be in a decline, the decrease is not rapid enough to trigger their vulnerability criteria. The large numbers and huge breeding range of about 12.9 million km^{2} (5 million sq mi), mean that this bunting is classified by the IUCN as being of least concern.

Populations have declined in recent decades in western Europe, including the British Isles, Belgium, the Netherlands, Austria, and Italy. The yellowhammer is a red-list (severely declining) species in Ireland and the UK. In 2016 the species went extinct on the Isle of Man. In eastern Europe, numbers appear to be stable, although the trend in Russia is unknown. Changes to agricultural practices are thought to be responsible for reduced breeding densities. The introduced population in New Zealand has been very successful, with breeding densities much higher than in the UK.

== In culture ==
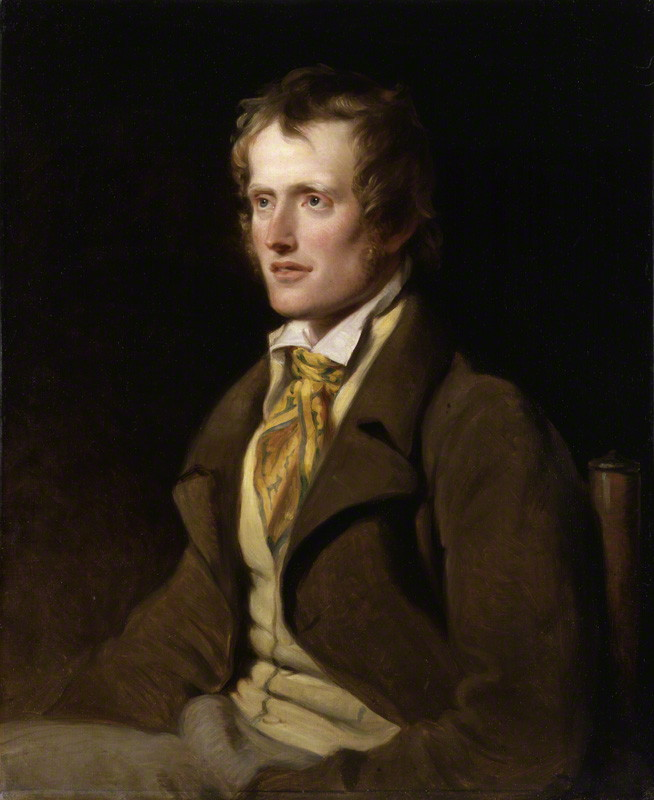
John Clare wrote two poems about the yellowhammer.

The yellowhammer is a conspicuous, vocal, and formerly common country bird, and has attracted human interest. Yellowham Wood and Yellowham Hill, near Dorchester England, both derive their names from the bird. Robbie Burns' poem "The Yellow, Yellow Yorlin'" gets its title from a Scottish name for the yellowhammer, which is given an obvious sexual connotation: "I met a pretty maid, an' unto her I said,/ 'I wad fain fin' your yellow, yellow yorlin'.' " More factual descriptions of the bird and its behaviour can be found in John Clare's "The Yellowhammer's Nest" and "The Yellowhammer", whose final lines read:

In early spring, when winds blow chilly cold,
The yellowhammer, trailing grass, will come
To fix a place and choose an early home,
With yellow breast and head of solid gold.

Enid Blyton helped to popularize the bird's song as "little bit of bread and no cheese" in books such as The Ship of Adventure and Five Go Off in a Caravan, and wrote a poem called "The Yellow-hammer".

Piano Concerto 4, 1st movement
Piano Concerto No. 4 in G major, 1st movement

Beethoven's student, Carl Czerny, and biographer Anton Schindler, both suggested that the composer got the idea for the first four notes of his 5th symphony from the yellowhammer's call, although more likely the opening of the 4th Piano Concerto was actually the work in question. Beethoven also used the yellowhammer theme in two piano sonatas, no. 21 in C major (the "Waldstein", Op.53) and No. 23 in F minor (the "Appassionata", Op.57).

Olivier Messiaen often used birdsong as an inspiration for his music, and the yellowhammer features in Chronochromie, Catalogue d'oiseaux, La fauvette des jardins and Méditations sur le mystère de la Sainte Trinité, appearing in four movements of the last piece.

An old legend links the yellowhammer to the devil. Its tongue was supposed to bear a drop of his blood, and the intricate pattern on the eggs was said to carry a concealed, possibly evil, message; these satanic associations sometimes led to the persecution of the bird. The unusual appearance of the eggs also led to the alternative names of scribble lark or scribble jack.

== Cited texts ==
- Atkinson, Carter T; Thomas, Nancy J; Hunter, D Bruce (2008). Parasitic Diseases of Wild Birds. London: Wiley-Blackwell. ISBN 978-0-8138-2081-1.
- Blyton, Enid (2008) [1944]. Enid Blyton's Nature Lover's Book. Chicago: Evans Brothers. ISBN 978-0-237-53568-1.
- Bruhn, Siglind (2008). Messiaen's Interpretations of Holiness and Trinity: Echoes of Medieval Theology in the Oratorio, Organ Meditations, and Opera. Hillsdale, New York: Pendragon Press. ISBN 978-1-57647-139-5.
- Clare, John (1835). The Rural Muse. London: Whittaker & Co.
- Cocker, Mark; Mabey, Richard (2005). Birds Britannica. London: Chatto & Windus. ISBN 978-0-7011-6907-7.
- Dingle, Christopher; Fallon, Robert (2013). Messiaen Perspectives 2: Techniques, Influence and Reception. Farnham, Surrey: Ashgate. ISBN 978-1-4724-1518-9.
- Haughton, Hugh; Phillips, Adam; Summerfield, Geoffrey, eds. (1994). John Clare in Context. Cambridge: Cambridge University Press. ISBN 978-0-521-44547-4.
- Jedrzejewska, Bogumila; Jedrzejewski, Wlodzimierz (1998). Predation in Vertebrate Communities: The Bialowieza Primeval Forest as a Case Study. Berlin: Springer. ISBN 978-3-540-64138-4.
- Jobling, James A (2010). The Helm Dictionary of Scientific Bird Names. London: Christopher Helm. ISBN 978-1-4081-2501-4.
- Lever, Christopher (2005). Naturalised Birds of the World (Poyser Monographs). London: Poyser. ISBN 978-1-4081-2825-1.
- Linnaeus, Carl (1758). Systema naturae per regna tria naturae, secundum classes, ordines, genera, species, cum characteribus, differentiis, synonymis, locis. Tomus I. Editio decima, reformata (in Latin). Holmiae: Laurentii Salvii. Archived from the original on 10 October 2008.
- Oliver, Walter Reginald Brook (1955). New Zealand Birds. Auckland: A H & A W Reed. OCLC 1575647.
- Olsson, Urban; Curson, Jon; Byers, Clive (1995). Buntings and Sparrows A Guide to the Buntings and North American Sparrows. Robertsbridge, East Sussex: Pica Press. ISBN 978-1-873403-19-8.
- Porter, Richard; Aspinall, Simon (2011). Birds of the United Arab Emirates. London: Christopher Helm. ISBN 978-1-4081-5257-7.
- Prins, Herbert H T; Gordon, Iain J, eds. (2014). Invasion Biology and Ecological Theory: Insights from a Continent in Transformation. Cambridge: Cambridge University Press. ISBN 978-1-107-03581-2.
- Rasmussen, Pamela C; Anderton, John (2005). Birds of South Asia. The Ripley Guide. Vol. 2. Washington, D C & Barcelona: Smithsonian Institution & Lynx Edicions.
- Shenton, Andrew (2008). Olivier Messiaen's System of Signs: Notes Towards Understanding His Music. Farnham, Surrey: Ashgate. ISBN 978-0-7546-6168-9.
- Snow, David; Perrins, Christopher M, eds. (1998). The Birds of the Western Palearctic concise edition (2 volumes). Oxford: Oxford University Press. ISBN 978-0-19-854099-1.
- Thayer, Alexander Wheelock; Forbes, Elliot, eds. (1991). Thayer's Life of Beethoven. Vol. 1. Princeton, New Jersey: Princeton University Press. ISBN 978-0-691-02717-3.
