= Pampaemberiza =

Pampaemberiza Temporal range: Middle Pleistocene

Scientific classification
- Kingdom: Animalia
- Phylum: Chordata
- Class: Aves
- Order: Passeriformes
- Family: Emberizidae
- Genus: †Pampaemberiza
- Species: †P. olrogii

Binomial name
- †Pampaemberiza olrogii Agnolin, 2007

Extinct genus of birds

Pampaemberiza is an extinct genus of emberizid that inhabited Argentina during the Middle Pleistocene.
