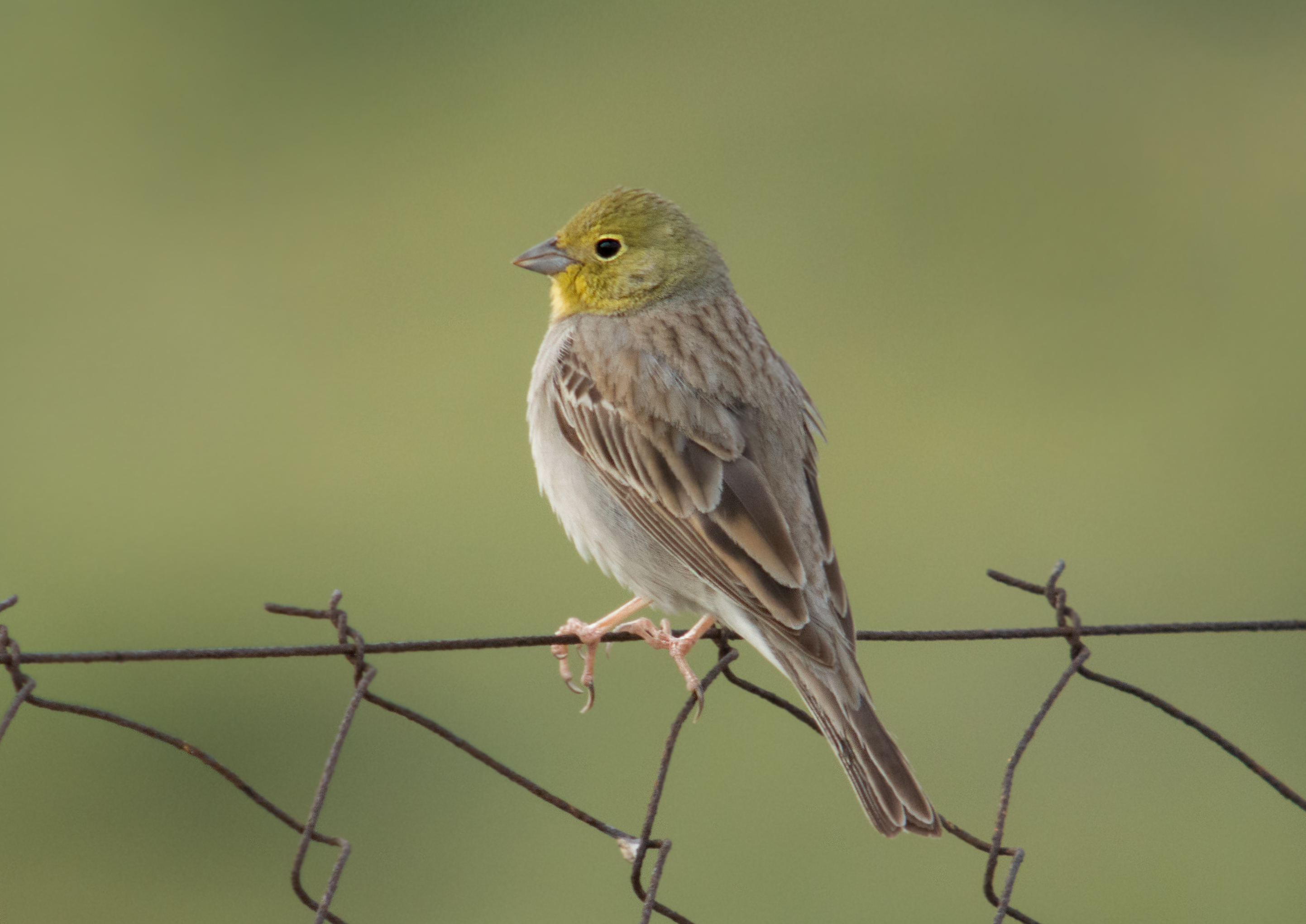
- Adult male, Lesvos, Greece

Conservation status
- Near Threatened (IUCN 3.1)

Scientific classification
- Kingdom: Animalia
- Phylum: Chordata
- Class: Aves
- Order: Passeriformes
- Family: Emberizidae
- Genus: Emberiza
- Species: E. cineracea

Binomial name
- Emberiza cineracea Brehm, 1855

= Cinereous bunting =

Species of bird

The cinereous bunting (Emberiza cineracea) is a bird in the bunting family Emberizidae, a passerine family now separated by most modern authors from the finches, Fringillidae. This species was first described by Christian Ludwig Brehm.

== Description ==
The cinereous bunting is a large (16.5–18 cm, 21–29.7 g), slim bunting with a long, white-cornered tail. The term cinereous describes its colouration. It is less streaked than many buntings and has a thick pale bill. It has a greyish back with only subdued dark markings, and a browner tint to the wings.

The adult male's head is dull yellow, with a brighter moustachial line and throat. In the nominate race of south-west Turkey, the rest of the underparts are grey, but the eastern form E. c. semenowi has yellow underparts.

Females are brownish grey above with a whitish throat and yellow only in the moustachial stripe. Young birds have a plain pale belly and streaking on the breast.

=== Song ===
The call is a harsh tschrip, and the song is a hoarse zru- zru-zru-zru.

== Ecology ==
=== Distribution ===
It breeds in southern Turkey and southern Iran, and winters around the Red Sea in north-eastern Africa and Yemen. A few isolated populations maintain a foothold within European borders, on Greek islands in the Aegean Sea, especially Lesbos.

=== Habitat ===
The breeding grounds of this species are typically found on dry, rocky slopes and uplands, where shrubby vegetation and sometimes conifers provide cover. It may also utilize areas with scattered trees, such as the Calabrian pine (Pinus brutia), or taller bushes. Migratory journeys take this species to dry, open country, including semi-deserts, low, rocky hills, and barren agricultural lands. Wintering sites are often located in coastal areas with sparse scrub vegetation.

=== Food and feeding ===
Like other buntings, the cinereous bunting feeds principally on seeds. It takes insects especially when feeding its young. Its normal clutch is three eggs.

== Status ==
This understudied migratory species has been categorized as "Near Threatened" on the IUCN Red List due to concerns regarding a declining population, likely driven by the ongoing deterioration and loss of its natural habitats.
