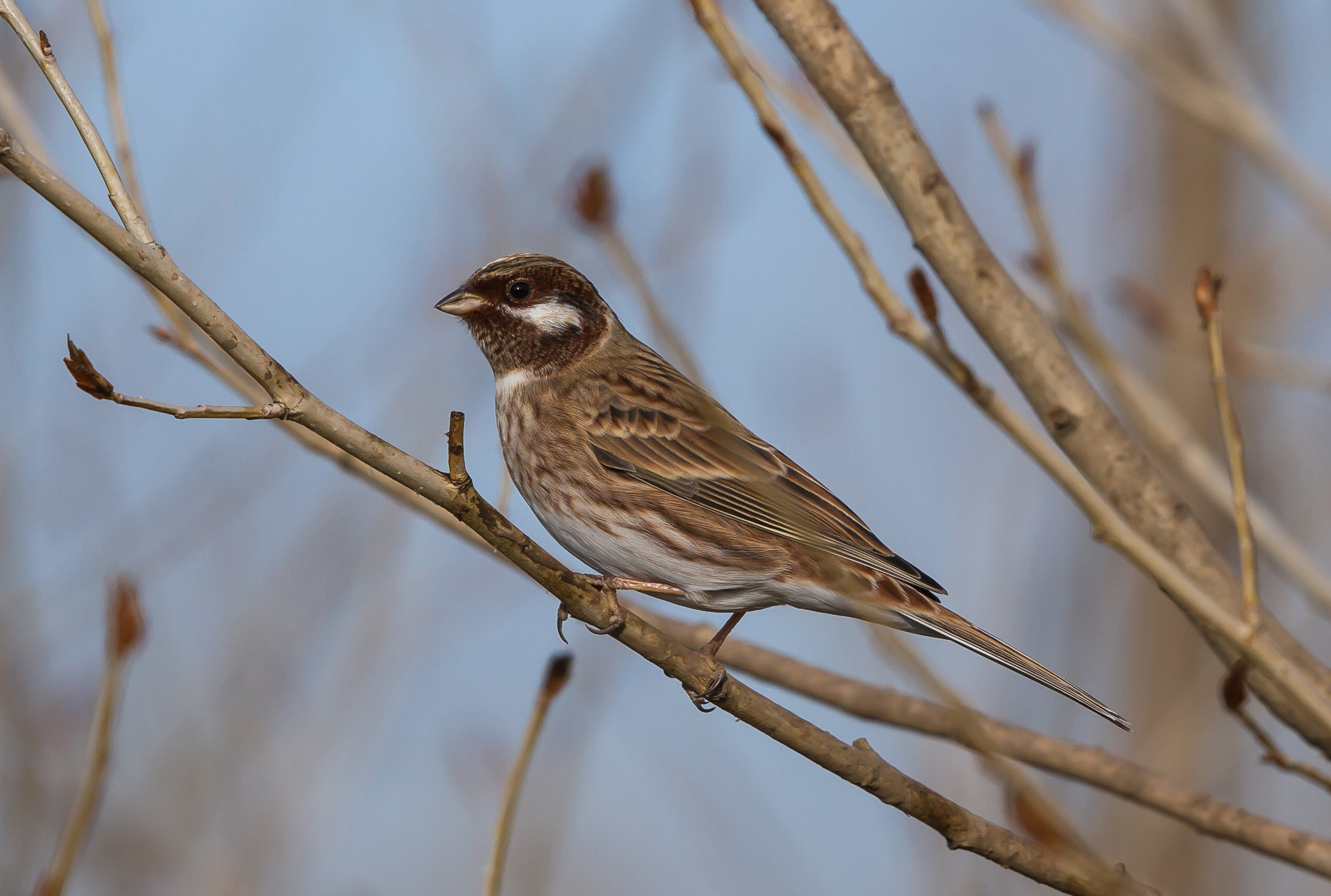

Conservation status
- Least Concern (IUCN 3.1)

Scientific classification
- Kingdom: Animalia
- Phylum: Chordata
- Class: Aves
- Order: Passeriformes
- Family: Emberizidae
- Genus: Emberiza
- Species: E. leucocephalos

Binomial name
- Emberiza leucocephalos Gmelin, SG, 1771

= Pine bunting =

Species of bird

The pine bunting (Emberiza leucocephalos) is a passerine bird in the bunting family Emberizidae, a group most modern authors now separate from the finches, Fringillidae. It lives in Eurosiberia east of the Urals.

== Etymology ==
The genus name Emberiza is from Old German Embritz, a bunting. The specific leucocephalos is from Ancient Greek leukos, "whites", and kephalos, "headed".

== Description and song ==
The pine bunting is a robust 16–17.5-centimetre bird, with a thick seed-eater's bill. The male has a white crown and cheeks, and a chestnut forehead and throat, and a heavily streaked brown back. The female is much duller and is more streaked on its undersides. Non-breeding plumage is like that of a yellowhammer, but with all the yellow replaced by white. Its song and calls are like those of the yellowhammer.

== Breeding and habitat ==
The pine bunting breeds across much of temperate Asia, migrating south to central Asia, north India and southern China in winter. It is common in all sorts of open land with some scrub or trees, including cultivation, but has a greater preference for open forest (usually pines) than the closely related yellowhammer. It is a rare vagrant to western Europe, but often winters in north-east Italy and Tuscany.

=== Appearance of pine bunting × yellowhammer hybrids ===
Hybrids between pine bunting and yellowhammer show a mixture of characters. One such bird, a vagrant in Suffolk, England in 1982, the "Sizewell bunting", is documented and illustrated with photographs in British Birds

Some doubt has been cast upon male birds which appear to be pure pine buntings, but show yellow primary fringes. Previously, in Britain, these were regarded as potentially hybrid birds, and not accepted by the British Birds Rarities Committee. However, since 2004, BBRC has regarded these birds as acceptable if they also meet the following conditions:

- the lores must be chestnut, not black or grey
- the throat must be extensively chestnut coloured, without a dark malar line or pale submoustachial line
- the supercilium should be chestnut or grey, but not white
- there should be no yellow on the head, or anywhere else except the primary fringes

== Diet ==
The pine bunting's natural food consists of seeds, and when feeding its young, insects. The nest is on the ground. Four to six eggs are laid, which show the hair-like markings characteristic of buntings.

== Gallery ==
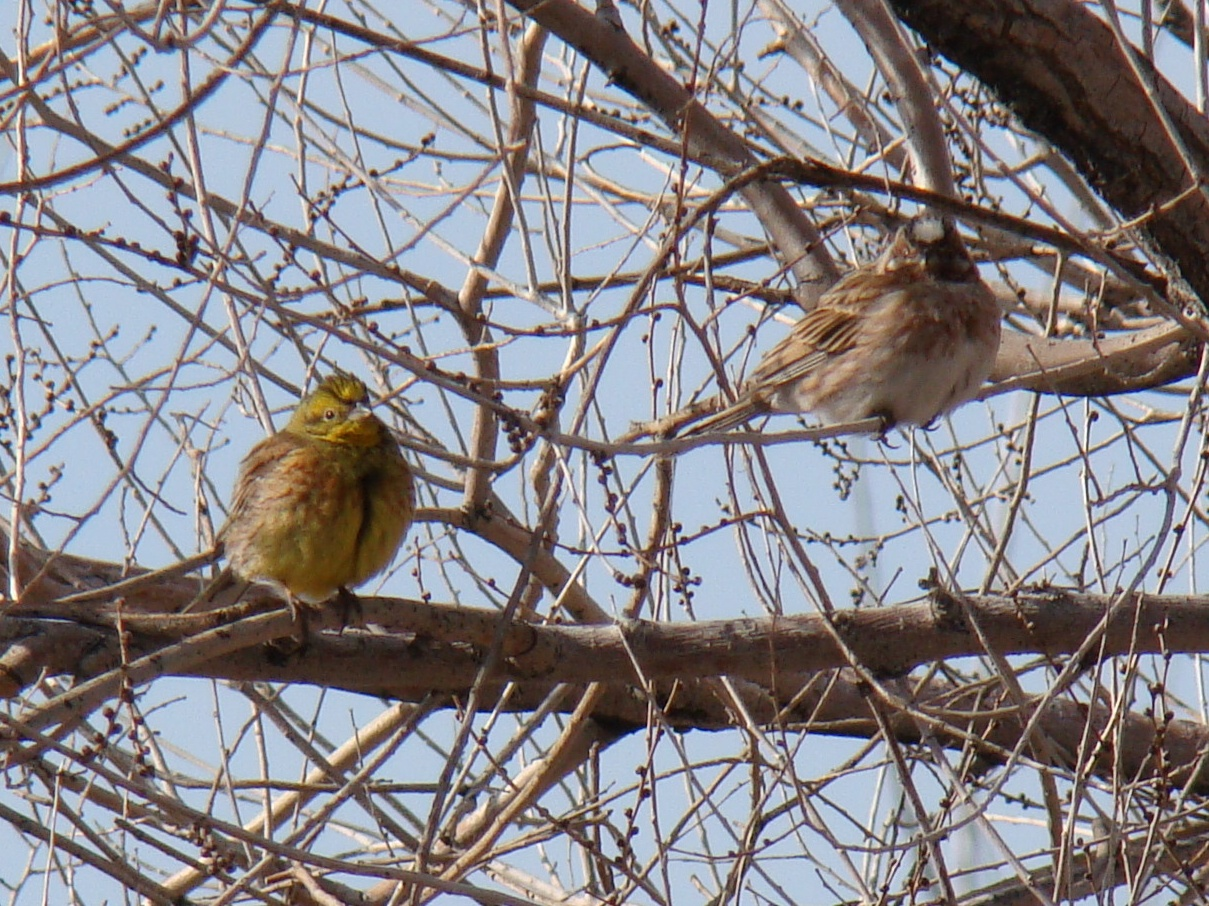
Yellowhammer (left) and pine bunting (right)

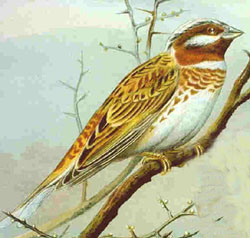

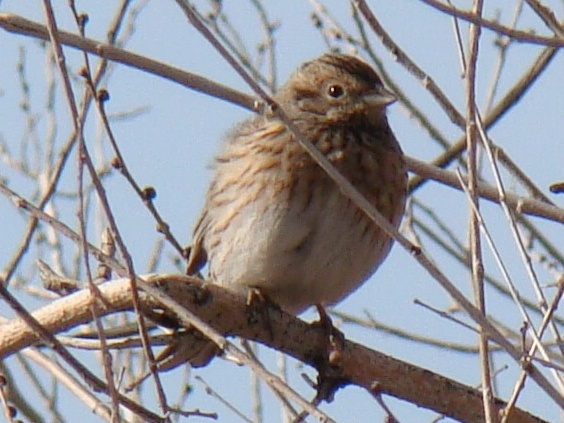
female

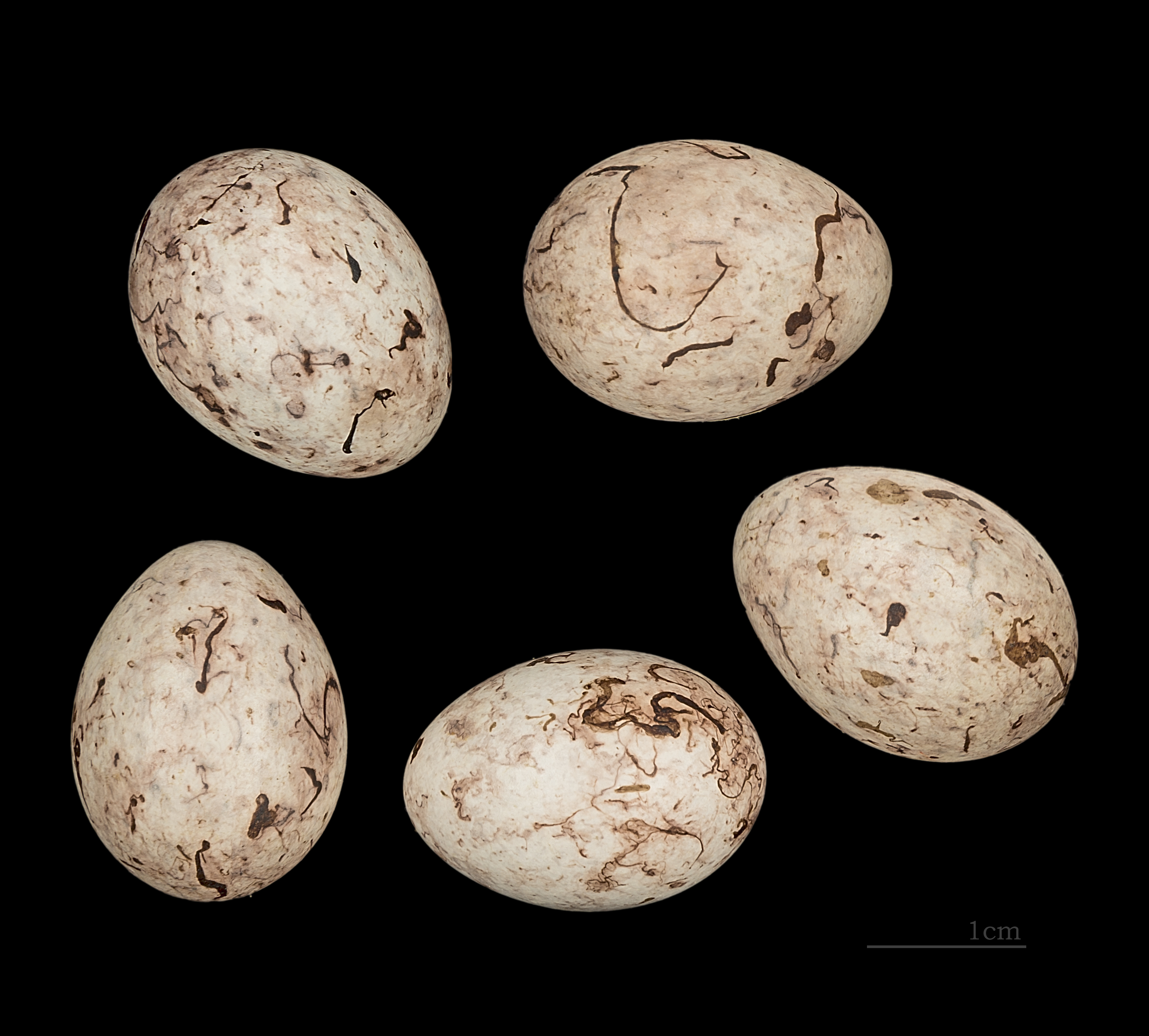
Eggs of pine bunting MHNT
