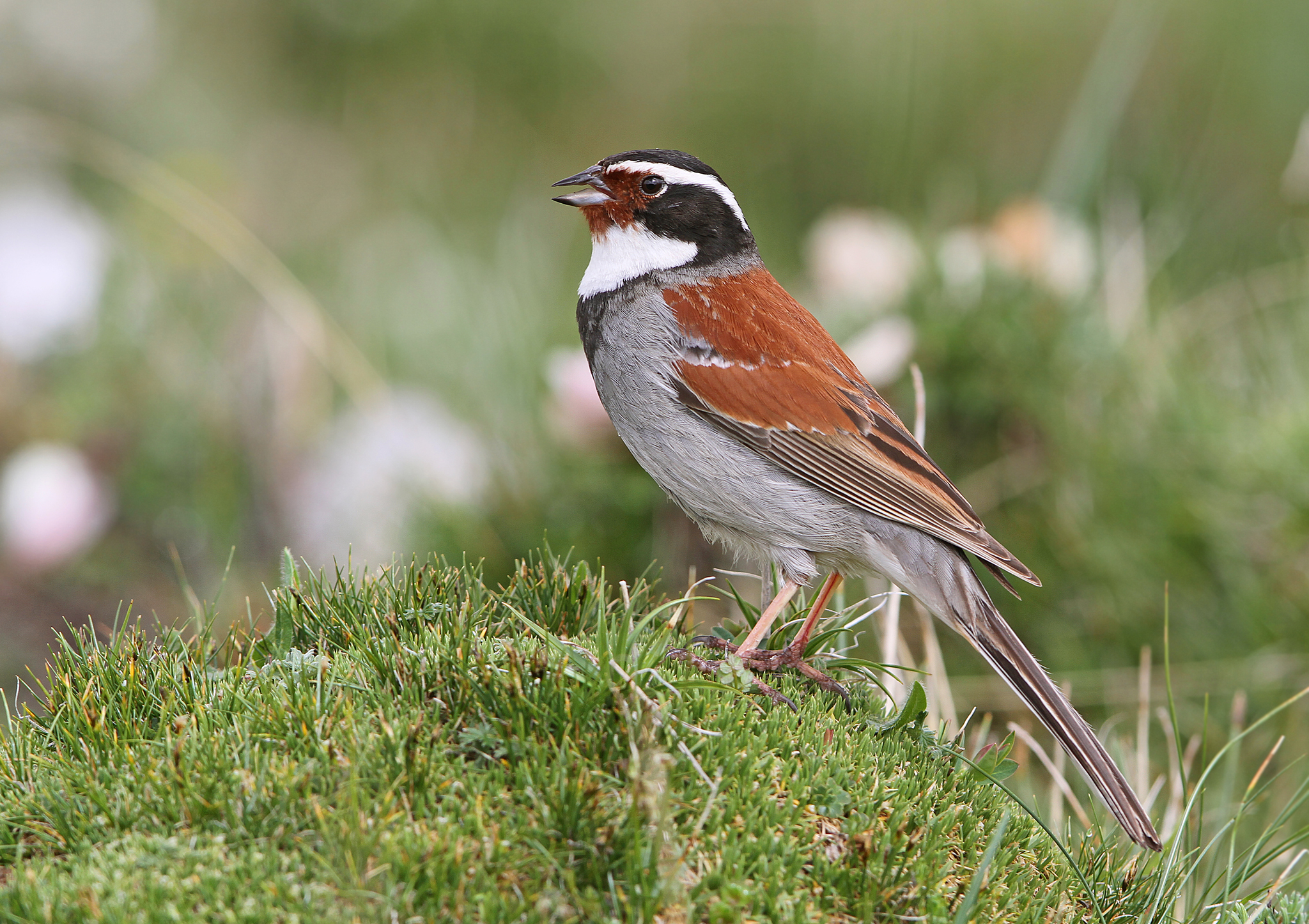

Conservation status
- Least Concern (IUCN 3.1)

Scientific classification
- Kingdom: Animalia
- Phylum: Chordata
- Class: Aves
- Order: Passeriformes
- Family: Emberizidae
- Genus: Emberiza
- Species: E. koslowi

Binomial name
- Emberiza koslowi Bianchi, 1904

= Tibetan bunting =

Species of bird

The Tibetan bunting (Emberiza koslowi) is a species of bird in the family Emberizidae. It is endemic to eastern side of the Tibetan Plateau.

== Etymology ==
The specific name "koslowi" for this species was given after Russian explorer Pyotr Kozlov.

== Description ==
The crown is black and there are white stripes at the head. The back is chestnut coloured.

== Behaviour ==
The domed nest structure of this species appears to be unique amongst the Emberizinae buntings which have open nest structures. Female lays 3 or 4 eggs.

They eat grains in winter and insects, like butterflies, grasshoppers and beetles, in summer.

Main predators of Tibetan bunting are birds of prey like falcons and owls and mammals like foxes, weasels and badgers.
