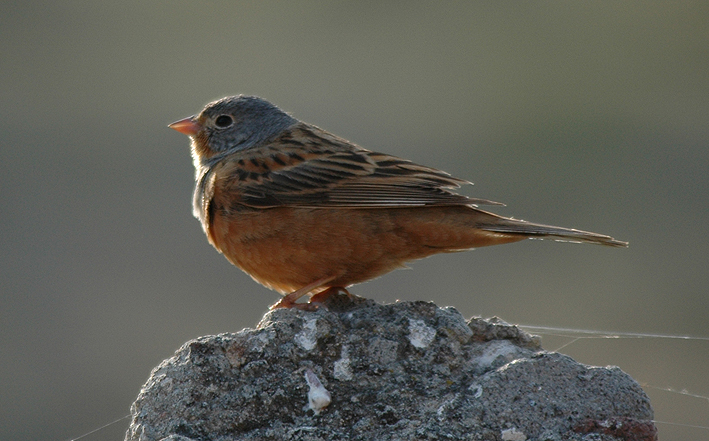
- Adult male

Conservation status
- Least Concern (IUCN 3.1)

Scientific classification
- Kingdom: Animalia
- Phylum: Chordata
- Class: Aves
- Order: Passeriformes
- Family: Emberizidae
- Genus: Emberiza
- Species: E. caesia

Binomial name
- Emberiza caesia Cretzschmar, 1827
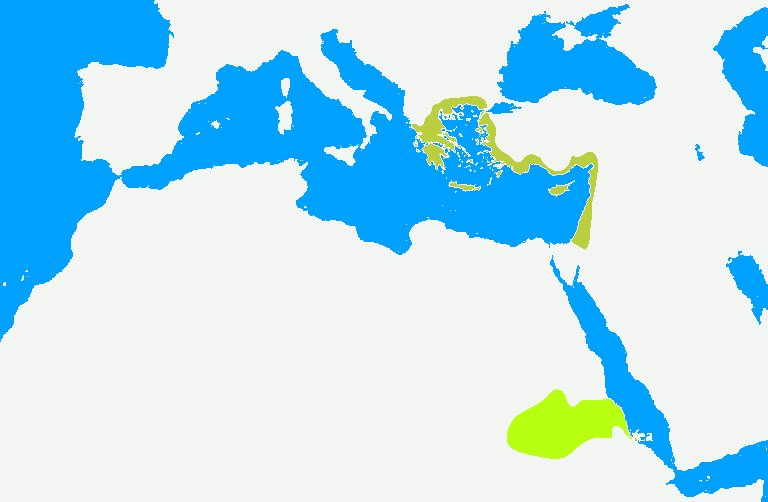

= Cretzschmar's bunting =

Species of bird

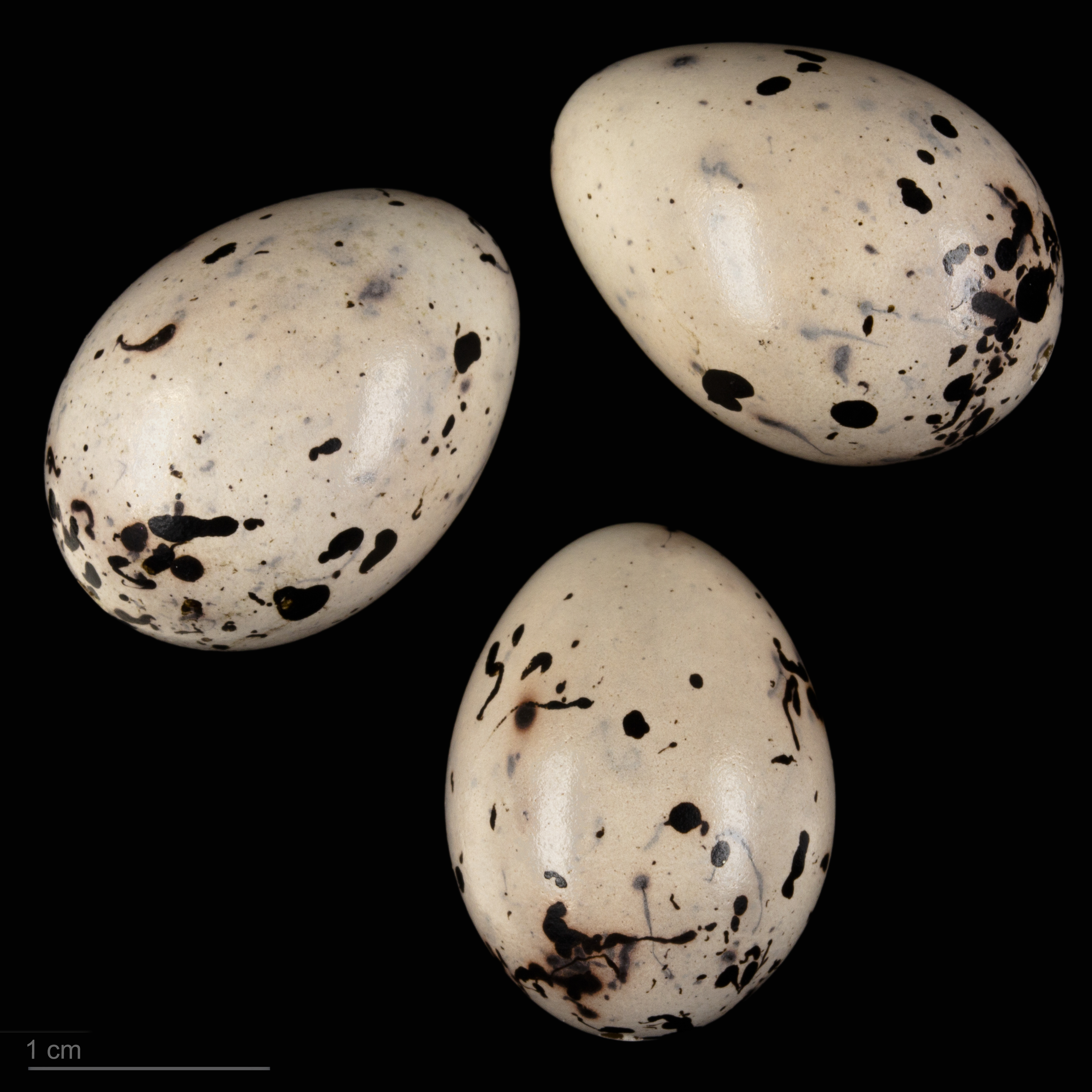
Emberiza caesia - MHNT

Cretzschmar's bunting (Emberiza caesia) is a passerine bird in the bunting family Emberizidae, a group now separated by most modern authors from the finches, Fringillidae.

== Etymology and taxonomy ==
The English common name commemorates the German physician and scientist Philipp Jakob Cretzschmar who founded the Senckenberg Natural History Museum. The genus name Emberiza is from Old German Embritz, a bunting. The specific caesias is from Latin caesius, "bluish-grey".

This species is monotypic.

== Description ==
This bird is smaller than ortolan. The breeding male has a grey head with orange moustaches. The upperparts are brown and heavily streaked, except on the rump, and the underparts are rusty orange. The stout bill is pink.

Females and young birds have a weaker head pattern, and are more similar to ortolans. They can be distinguished by the warm brown rump and white eye-ring.

== Ecology ==
=== Distribution ===
Cretzschmar's bunting breeds on sunny open hillsides with some bushes. It is mainly coastal or insular, and often breeds at lower levels than the closely related ortolan bunting where both occur. It lays four to six eggs in a ground nest. Its natural food consists of seeds and when feeding young, insects.

=== Habitat ===
It breeds in Greece, Turkey, Cyprus and the Levant. It is migratory, wintering in Sudan and northern Eritrea. It is a very rare wanderer to western Europe.

=== Food and feeding ===
This species forages almost entirely on the ground, feeding on small seeds, especially from grasses, and supplementing its diet with small invertebrates, particularly ants.

== Status ==
This species is classified as "Least Concern" in the IUCN Red List due to its extensive range and large population size, neither of which meet the criteria for threatened status. While population trends are uncertain, there's no evidence of a rapid decline that would warrant a higher conservation concern.

Europe hosts an estimated 230,000-451,000 mature individuals, comprising 85% of the global range. This suggests a preliminary global population size of 271,000-531,000 mature individuals, though further refinement is needed.
