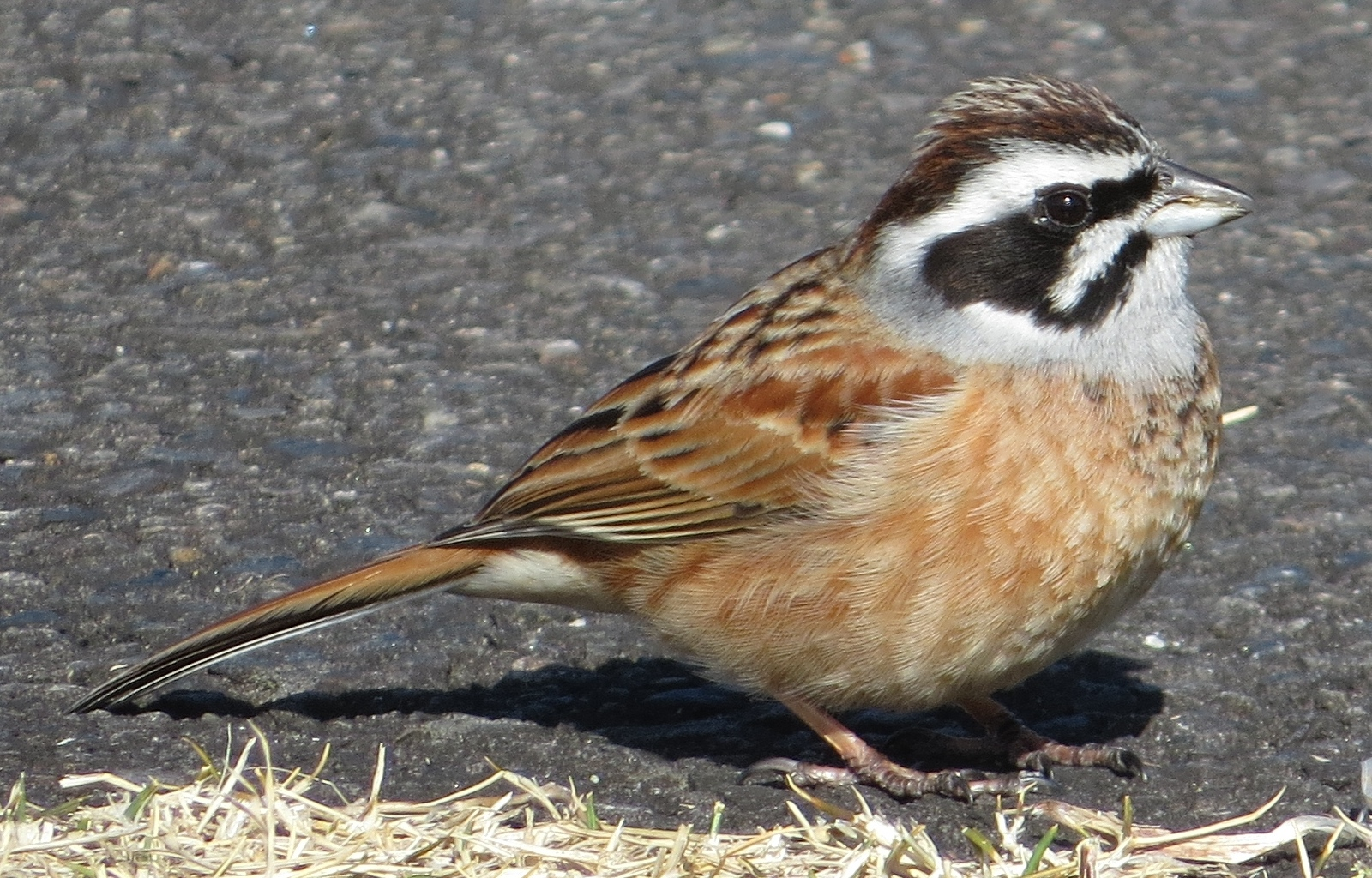

Conservation status
- Least Concern (IUCN 3.1)

Scientific classification
- Kingdom: Animalia
- Phylum: Chordata
- Class: Aves
- Order: Passeriformes
- Family: Emberizidae
- Genus: Emberiza
- Species: E. cioides

Binomial name
- Emberiza cioides Brandt, 1843

= Meadow bunting =

Species of bird

The meadow bunting or Siberian meadow bunting (Emberiza cioides) is a passerine bird of eastern Asia which belongs to the genus Emberiza in the bunting family Emberizidae.

== Description ==
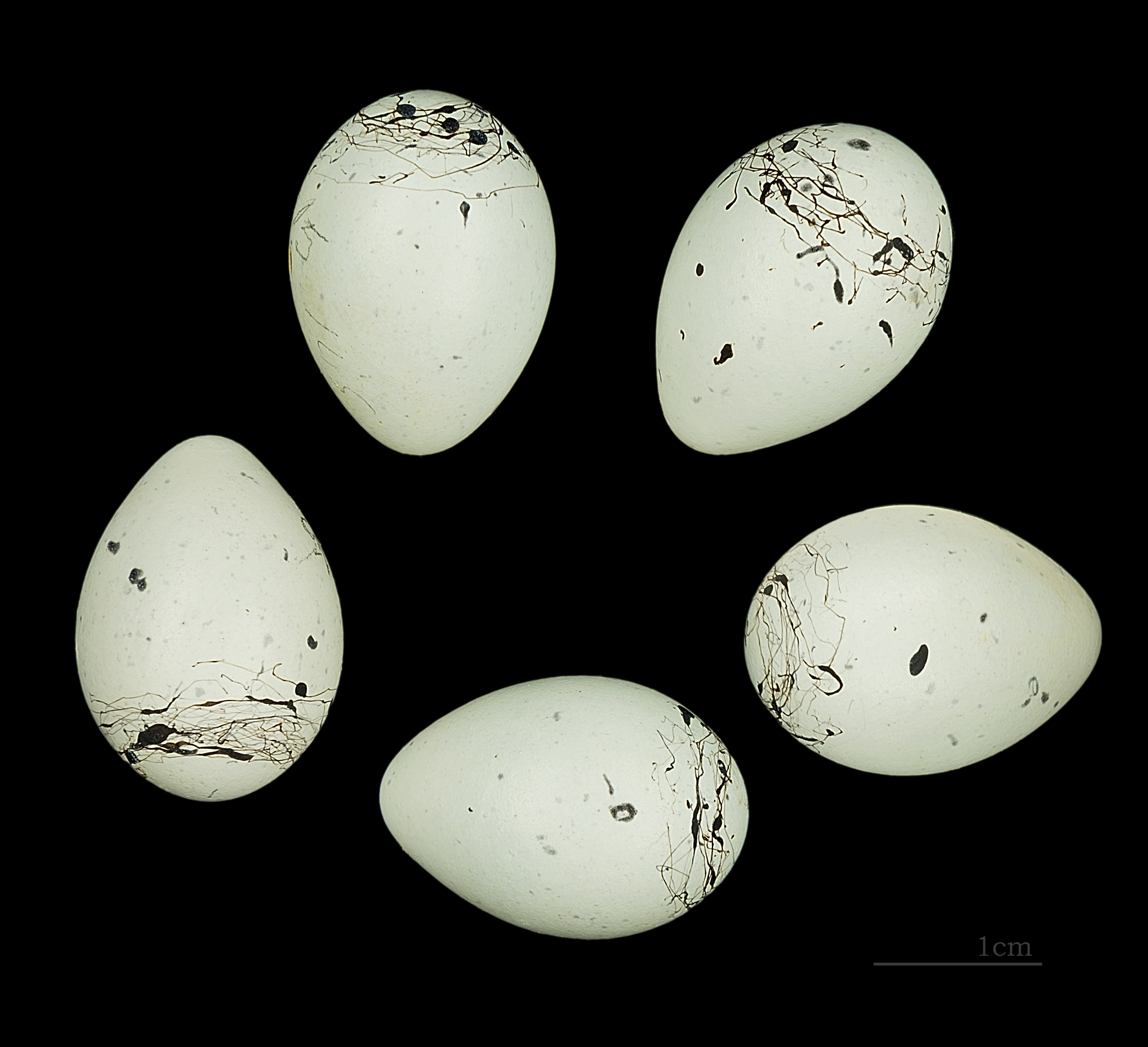
Emberiza cioides MHNT

The meadow bunting is 15 to 16.5 cm long. The male is mostly rufous-brown with dark streaks on the back. The boldly-patterned head is brown with white eyebrows, moustachial stripe and throat and grey sides to the neck. The outer tail-feathers are white and the legs are pinkish-brown. Females are similar but are duller and paler with a less well-defined head pattern.

The song is a short, hurried phrase given from a prominent perch. The call is a series of up to four sharp notes.

It breeds in southern Siberia, northern and eastern China, eastern Kazakhstan, Kyrgyzstan, Mongolia, Korea and Japan. It is fairly non-migratory but northern birds move south as far as southern China and Taiwan. There are several records from Europe but many of these are considered to be escapes from captivity rather than genuine vagrants. It occurs in dry, open habitats such as scrub, farmland, grassland and open woodland.

The nest is built low in bushes or on the ground. Three to five eggs are laid and are incubated for 11 days. The young birds fledge after another 11 days. Pairs are monogamous and use the same area for breeding several years in a row.
