= Emberiza parva =

Emberiza parva Temporal range: Pliocene

Scientific classification
- Kingdom: Animalia
- Phylum: Chordata
- Class: Aves
- Order: Passeriformes
- Family: Emberizidae
- Genus: Emberiza
- Species: †E. parva

Binomial name
- †Emberiza parva Kessler, 2013

Extinct species of bird

Emberiza parva is an extinct species of Emberiza that inhabited Hungary during the Neogene period.
