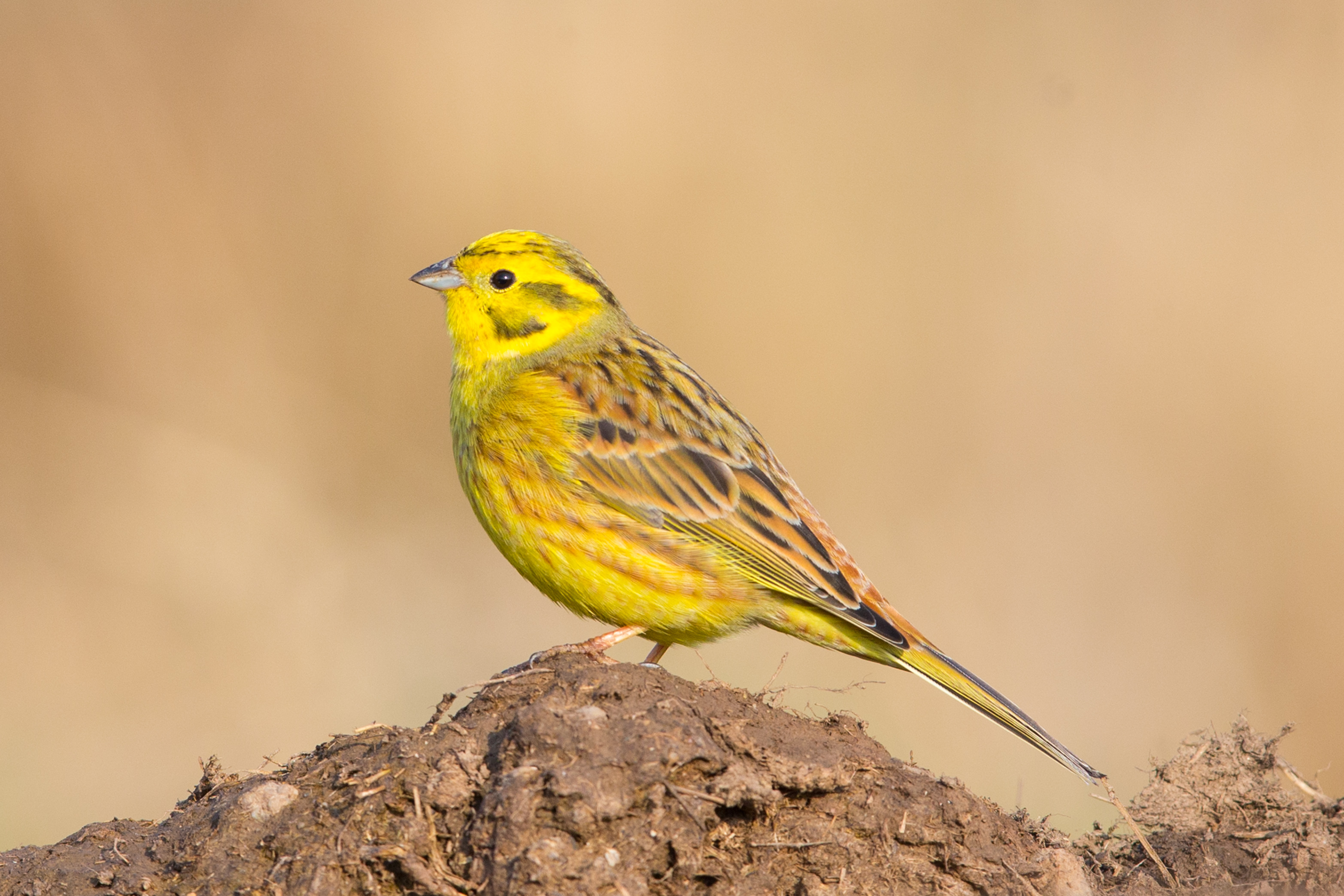
- Yellowhammer (Emberiza citrinella) Male

Scientific classification
- Kingdom: Animalia
- Phylum: Chordata
- Class: Aves
- Order: Passeriformes
- Family: Emberizidae
- Genus: Emberiza; Linnaeus, 1758

Type species
- Emberiza citrinella Linnaeus, 1758

Synonyms
- Onychospina Bonaparte, 1853; Onychospiza Rey, 1872 (incorrect subsequent spelling)

= Emberiza =

Genus of birds

Emberiza is a genus of Old World buntings in the family Emberizidae. The genus contains 15 species. They are seed-eating birds with stubby, conical bills that inhabit open and half-open habitats, including deserts, stony drylands, shrubland, savanna, and open taiga forests.

== Taxonomy ==
The family Emberizidae was formerly much larger and included the species now placed in the Passerellidae (New World sparrows) and Calcariidae (longspurs and snow buntings). Molecular phylogenetic studies found that the large family consisted of distinct clades that were better treated as separate families.

The genus Emberiza was introduced by the Swedish naturalist Carl Linnaeus in 1758 in the tenth edition of his Systema Naturae. The type species was subsequently designated by the English zoologist George Gray as Emberiza citrinella Linnaeus, 1758, the yellowhammer. The genus name Emberiza is from Old German Embritz, a bunting. The origin of the English "bunting" is unknown. Species in the New World genus Passerina include the word "bunting" in their common names, but are now classed in the family Cardinalidae.

A 2008 genetic study found that three emberizid species that were placed in their own monotypic genera clustered within the Emberiza. These were the crested bunting (Melophus lathami), the slaty bunting (Latouchiornis siemsseni), and the corn bunting (Miliaria calandra). All three species are now included in the genus Emberiza.

A large DNA-based study of the passerines published in 2019 found that the buntings are most closely related to the longspurs and snow buntings in the family Calcariidae.

Ornithologists Edward Dickinson and Leslie Christidis in the fourth edition of the Howard and Moore Complete Checklist of the Birds of the World chose to split up Emberiza and recognise the genera Fringillaria, Melophus, Granativora, Emberiza, and Schoeniclus. Their example has not been followed by the online version of the Handbook of the Birds of the World nor by Frank Gill and David Donsker in the list of world birds that they maintain on behalf of the International Ornithologists' Union. The British Ornithologists' Union has argued that splitting the genus provides little benefit and destabilizes the nomenclature.

The cladogram below is based on a study published in 2021.

- Emberiza
  - Corn bunting – Emberiza calandra
  - - Chestnut-eared bunting – Emberiza fucata
    - - Tibetan bunting – Emberiza koslowi
      - - - Jankowski's bunting – Emberiza jankowskii
          - - Meadow bunting – Emberiza cioides
            - - Rock bunting – Emberiza cia
              - Godlewski's bunting – Emberiza godlewskii
        - - - Grey-necked bunting – Emberiza buchanani
            - - Cinereous bunting – Emberiza cineracea
              - - Cretzschmar's bunting – Emberiza caesia
                - Ortolan bunting – Emberiza hortulana
          - - Cirl bunting – Emberiza cirlus
            - - White-capped bunting – Emberiza stewarti
              - - Yellowhammer – Emberiza citrinella
                - Pine bunting – Emberiza leucocephalos

== List of species ==
The genus contains the following 15 species.

Image	Common name	Scientific name	Distribution
	Corn bunting	Emberiza calandra	Western Europe and North Africa across to northwestern China.
	Yellowhammer	Emberiza citrinella	southeast England and most of Europe east to the northwestern corner of Russia and western Ukraine.
	Pine bunting	Emberiza leucocephalos	Asia
	Rock bunting	Emberiza cia	northwest Africa, southern Europe east to central Asia, and the Himalayas
	Godlewski's bunting	Emberiza godlewskii	China, Pakistan, India, Kazakhstan, Mongolia, Myanmar, and Russia.
	Meadow bunting	Emberiza cioides	southern Siberia, northern and eastern China, eastern Kazakhstan, Kyrgyzstan, Mongolia, Korea and Japan.
	White-capped bunting	Emberiza stewarti	Afghanistan, India, Iran, Kazakhstan, Kyrgyzstan, Nepal, Pakistan, Tajikistan, Turkmenistan, and Uzbekistan.
	Jankowski's bunting	Emberiza jankowskii	Russian Far East, Manchuria and far northeastern Korea
	Grey-necked bunting	Emberiza buchanani	Caspian Sea to the Altai Mountains in Central Asia
	Cinereous bunting	Emberiza cineracea	southern Turkey and southern Iran
	Ortolan bunting	Emberiza hortulana	European countries and western Asia
	Cretzschmar's bunting	Emberiza caesia	Greece, Turkey, Cyprus and the Levant.
	Cirl bunting	Emberiza cirlus	southern Europe, on the Mediterranean islands and in north Africa
	Chestnut-eared bunting	Emberiza fucata	the Himalayas locally across China to south-eastern Siberia, Korea and northern Japan
	Tibetan bunting	Emberiza koslowi	Tibet

Extinct species have been described:

- † Long-legged bunting (Emberiza alcoveri) (Late Quaternary)
- † Emberiza shaamarica (Late Pliocene of Central Asia)
- † Emberiza polgardiensis (Upper Miocene of Hungary)
- † Emberiza media (Pliocene of Hungary)
- † Emberiza parva (Pliocene of Hungary)
- †Emberiza gaspariskii (Pliocene of Hungary)
- †Emberiza bartoki (Middle Miocene of Hungary) (Nomen dubium)

Emberiza pannonica from the upper Miocene of Hungary is also referred to this genus, but was later found to be a member of Muscicapidae.
