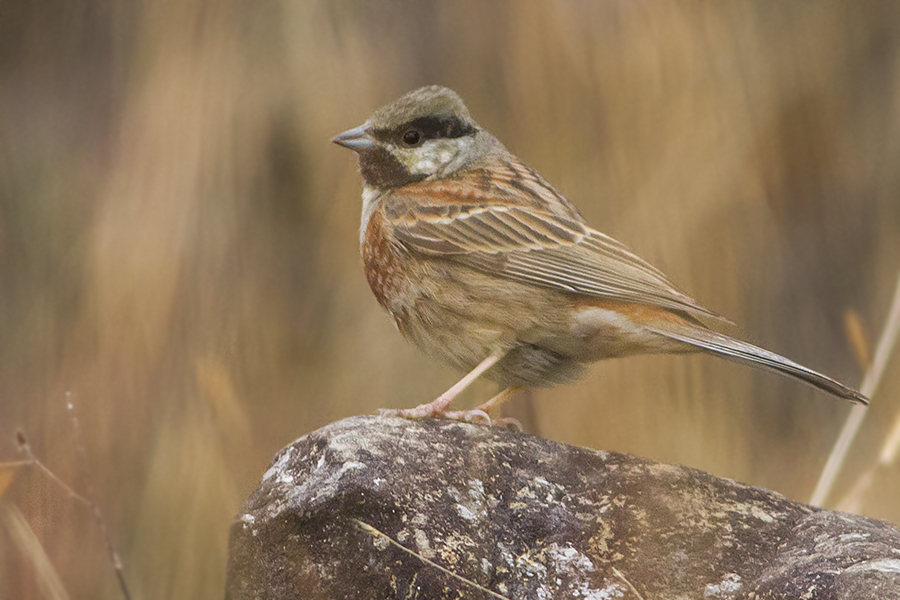
- Emberiza stewarti, male (♂) in breeding plumage from Nalni, Nainital, Uttarakhand

Conservation status
- Least Concern (IUCN 3.1)

Scientific classification
- Kingdom: Animalia
- Phylum: Chordata
- Class: Aves
- Order: Passeriformes
- Family: Emberizidae
- Genus: Emberiza
- Species: E. stewarti

Binomial name
- Emberiza stewarti (Blyth, 1854)

= White-capped bunting =

Species of bird

The white-capped bunting or chestnut-breasted bunting (Emberiza stewarti) is a species of bird in the family Emberizidae. It is found in Afghanistan, India, Iran, Kazakhstan, Kyrgyzstan, Nepal, Pakistan, Tajikistan, Turkmenistan, and Uzbekistan. Its natural habitats are boreal forests, boreal shrubland, and temperate grassland.

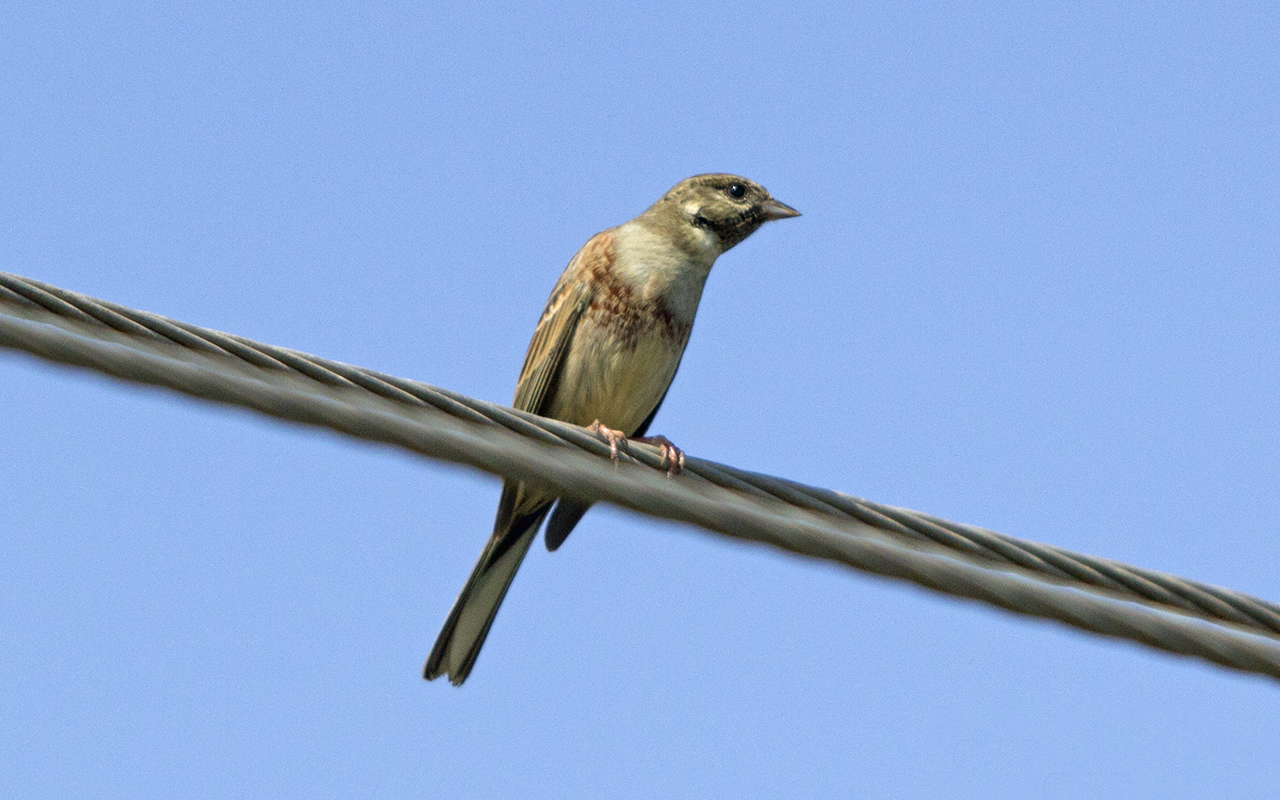
Male white-capped bunting
