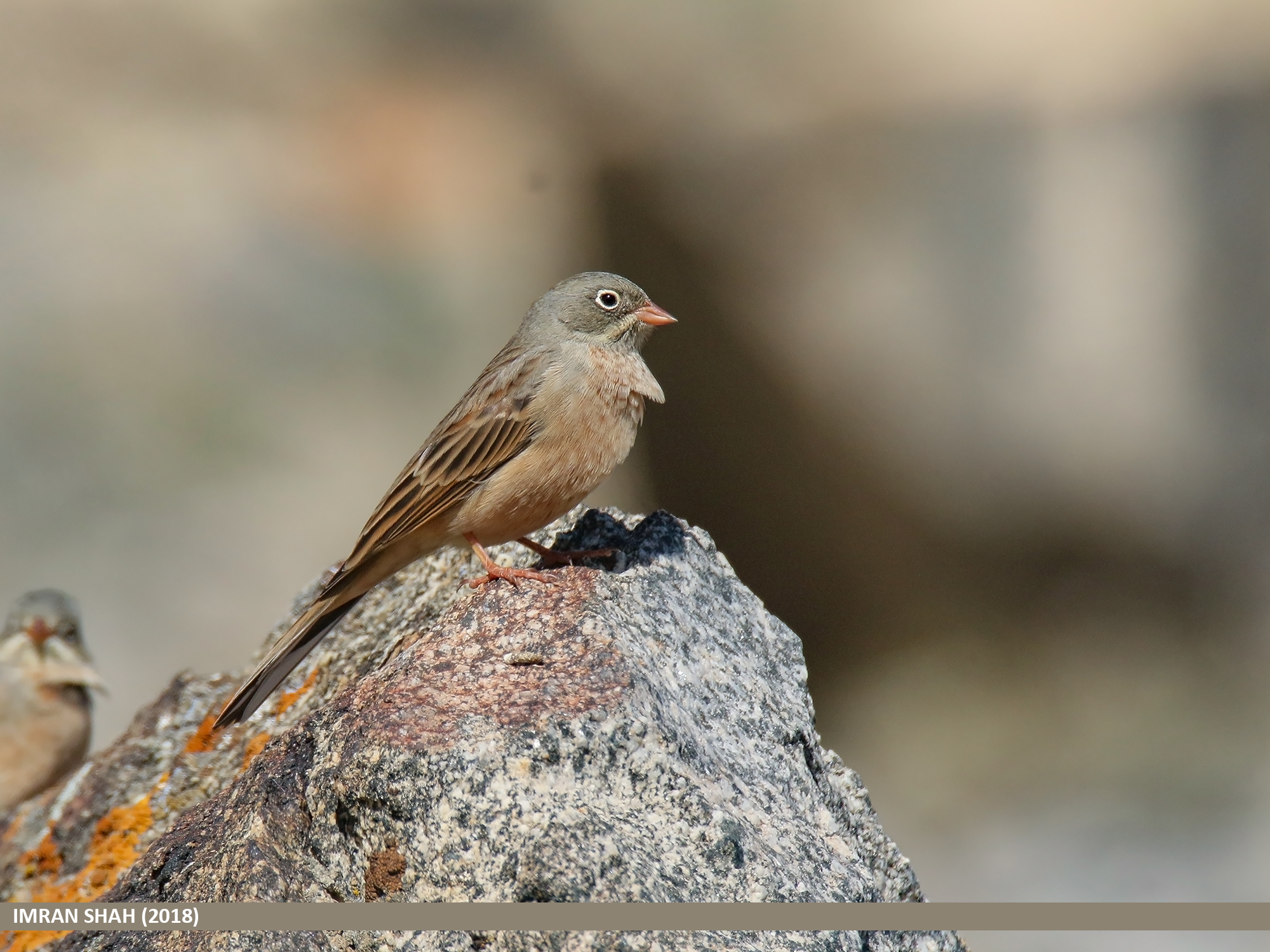

Conservation status
- Least Concern (IUCN 3.1)

Scientific classification
- Kingdom: Animalia
- Phylum: Chordata
- Class: Aves
- Order: Passeriformes
- Family: Emberizidae
- Genus: Emberiza
- Species: E. buchanani

Binomial name
- Emberiza buchanani Blyth, 1845

Synonyms
- Euspiza huttoni; Glycyspina huttoni

= Grey-necked bunting =

Species of bird

The grey-necked bunting (Emberiza buchanani), sometimes referred to as grey-hooded bunting (a name also in use for chestnut-eared bunting) is a species of bird in the family Emberizidae. It breeds along a wide distribution range from the Caspian Sea to the Altai Mountains in Central Asia and winters in parts of Southern Asia. Like other buntings it is found in small flocks.

== Description ==
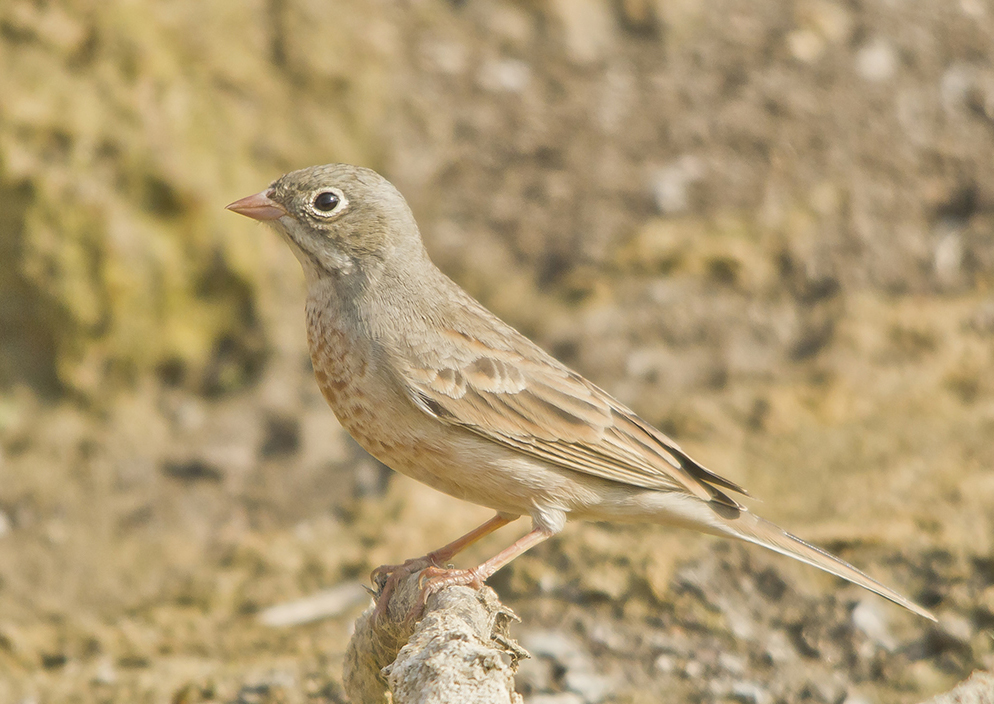
Grey necked Bunting at Rajkot

This bunting has a long pink bill and is greyish above. The male has a distinctive white eye-ring that stands out in contrast to the grey hood. The chin and throat are whitish pink and are bordered by grey malar stripes. The underparts are pinkish brown. The female is duller but the moustachial stripe can appear more noticeable. The outer tail feathers are whitish.

The species was described by Edward Blyth based on a drawing by Francis Buchanan-Hamilton after whom the species is named. It has been suggested that the actual date of the description was 1845 due to delays in the publication of the journal of The Asiatic Society. A supposed type specimen in the Indian Museum was never located.

In winter it makes a short subdued click note but the song is a metalling jingle made of swee-swee notes ending with a dzwe-ee-dul.

Three subspecies are noted nominate buchanani, neobscura, and ceruttii.

== Habitat and distribution ==
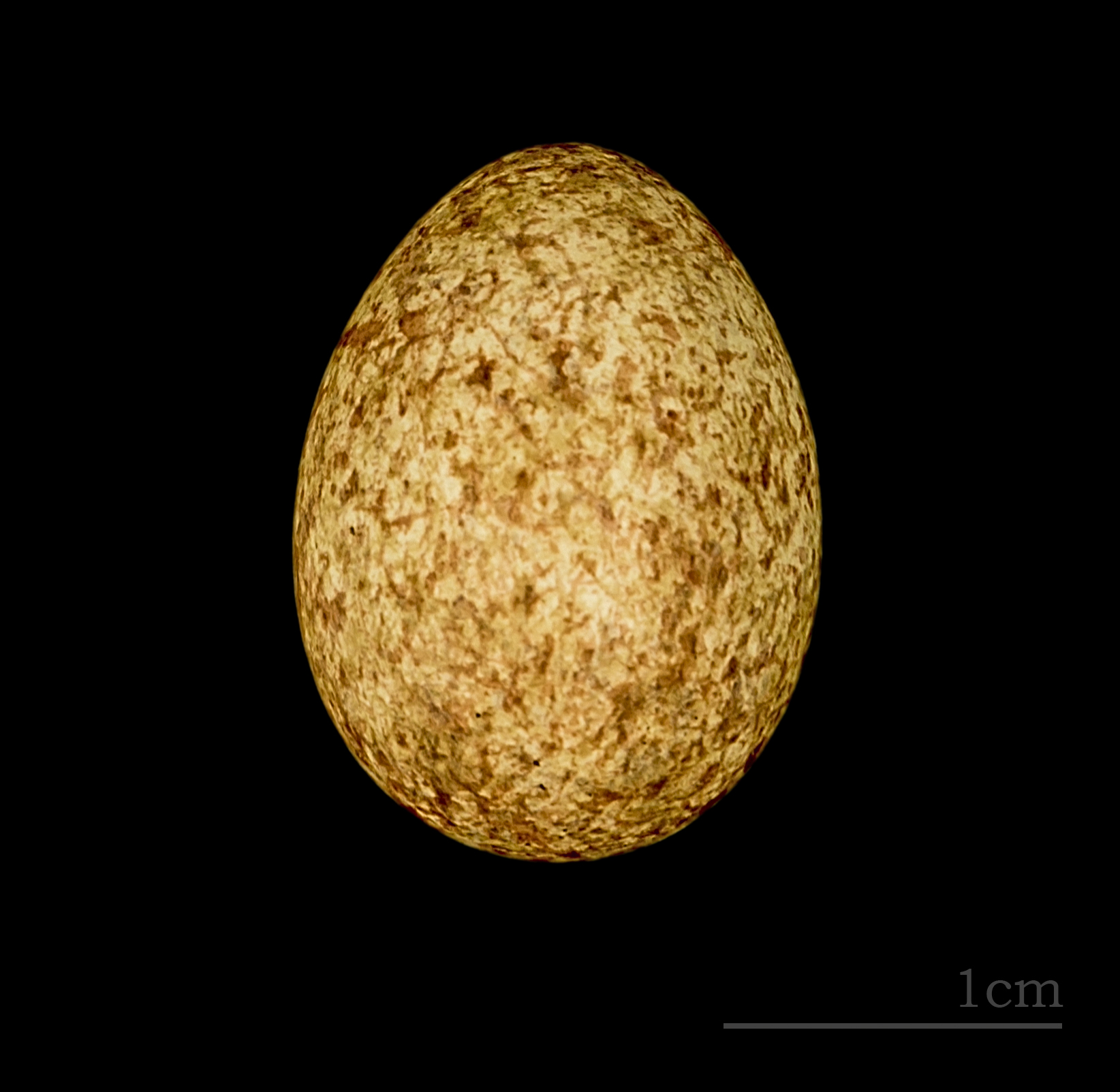
Emberiza buchanani MHNT

This bunting is found mainly in dry and open habitats, often stony, scrubby hillsides covered with low thorn scrub. Birds that breed in the Baluchistan region winter in India moving through Gujarat in September and returning in March to their breeding grounds. It is found in Afghanistan, Armenia, Azerbaijan, Bhutan, Nepal, China, Hong Kong, India, Iran, Israel, Kazakhstan, Mongolia, Oman, Pakistan, Russia, Syria, Tajikistan, Turkey, Turkmenistan, and Uzbekistan.

It is an extremely rare vagrant north of its breeding range, with recent records from Finland and the Netherlands, though wanderers may be overlooked due to its similarity, in non-breeding plumage, to the closely related and far commoner ortolan bunting.

They winter in parts of Africa, West Asia, and parts of South Asia as far south as Sri Lanka.

Its natural habitat is temperate grassland mainly below 7000 ft. In winter it is found in weedy or stubbly fields. It nests on the ground under some overhanging vegetation. The nest is lined with grass and hair. The song given from a perch is a series of short and shrill notes that increase in volume.

A tick Hyalomma turanicum has been recorded on birds from Kazakhstan.

Claud Ticehurst noted that males and females migrated separately.
