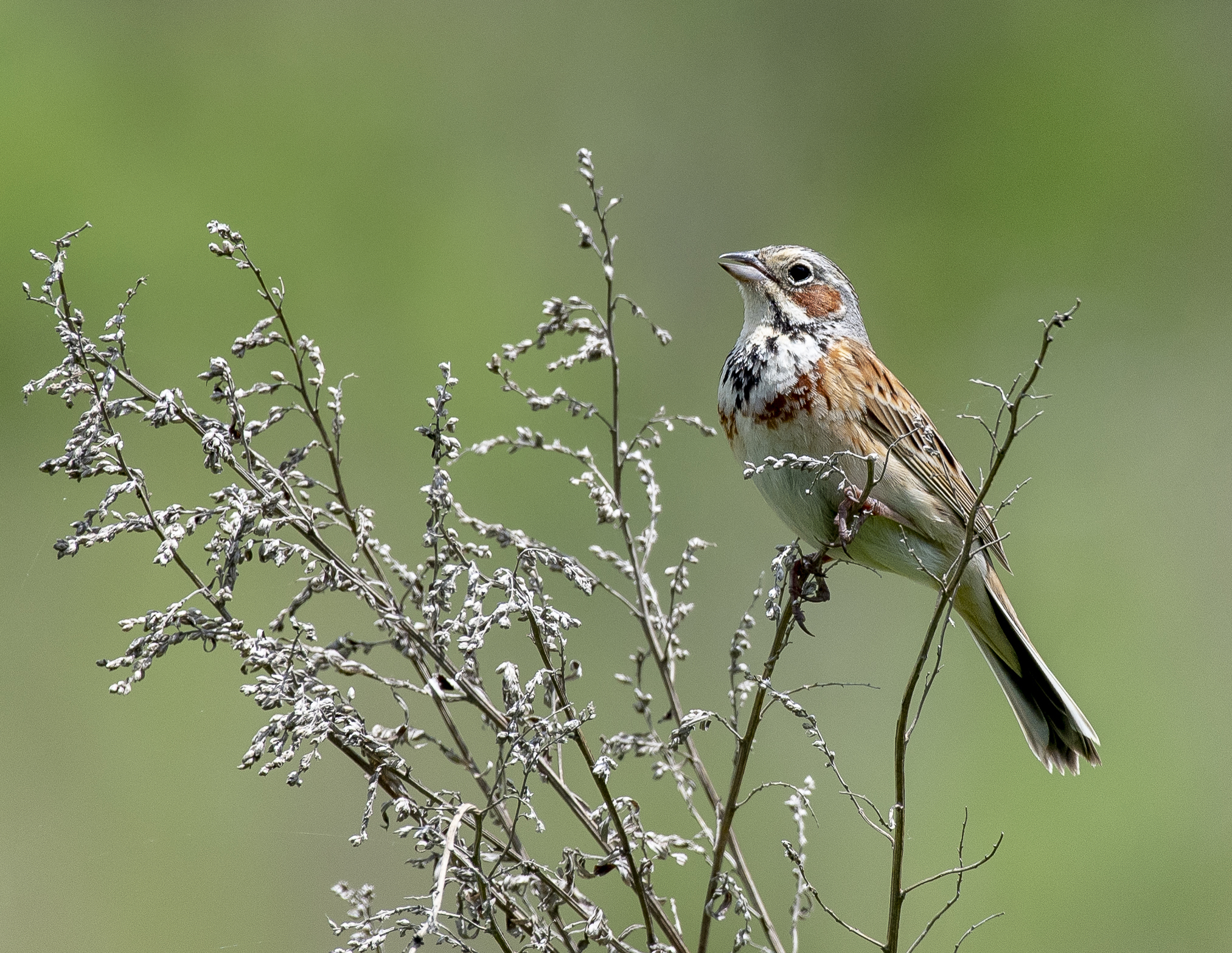

Conservation status
- Least Concern (IUCN 3.1)

Scientific classification
- Kingdom: Animalia
- Phylum: Chordata
- Class: Aves
- Order: Passeriformes
- Family: Emberizidae
- Genus: Emberiza
- Species: E. fucata

Binomial name
- Emberiza fucata Pallas, 1776

= Chestnut-eared bunting =

Species of bird

The chestnut-eared bunting (Emberiza fucata), also called grey-headed bunting or grey-hooded bunting, with the latter name also used for grey-necked bunting, is a passerine bird in the bunting family Emberizidae.

The genus name Emberiza is from Old German Embritz, a bunting. The specific fucata is Latin for "painted" from fucare, "to paint red".

== Description ==
It is 15 to 16 cm in length. The plumage is mostly brown with dark streaks. The male has a grey crown and nape with dark streaks, chestnut ear-coverts and bands of black and chestnut across the breast. There is a rufous patch on the shoulders and the rump is also rufous. Females are similar to the males but duller with a less distinct head and breast pattern. First-winter birds are plainer but show warm brown ear-coverts and have an obvious ring around the eye.

Its voice is similar to the rustic bunting but quieter. The song is a rapid twittering which begins with staccato notes and then accelerates before ending with a distinctive two or three note phrase. The call is an explosive pzick.

== Distribution and habitat ==
The breeding range extends from the Himalayas locally across China to south-eastern Siberia, Korea and northern Japan. Northern birds migrate south to winter in southern Japan, southern China, Taiwan, north-eastern India, Bangladesh and Southeast Asia. The species is a vagrant to Kazakhstan and in October 2004 the first European record occurred at Fair Isle in Scotland. Preferred habitats include scrub, fields and grassland.

== Reproduction ==
The cup-shaped nest is built at ground level or low in a bush. Three to six eggs are laid with four being most common. These are whitish with reddish-brown speckling and are incubated for 12 days. The breeding season is variable, lasting from May to August in India, May to July in Honshū and June to August in Hokkaidō.

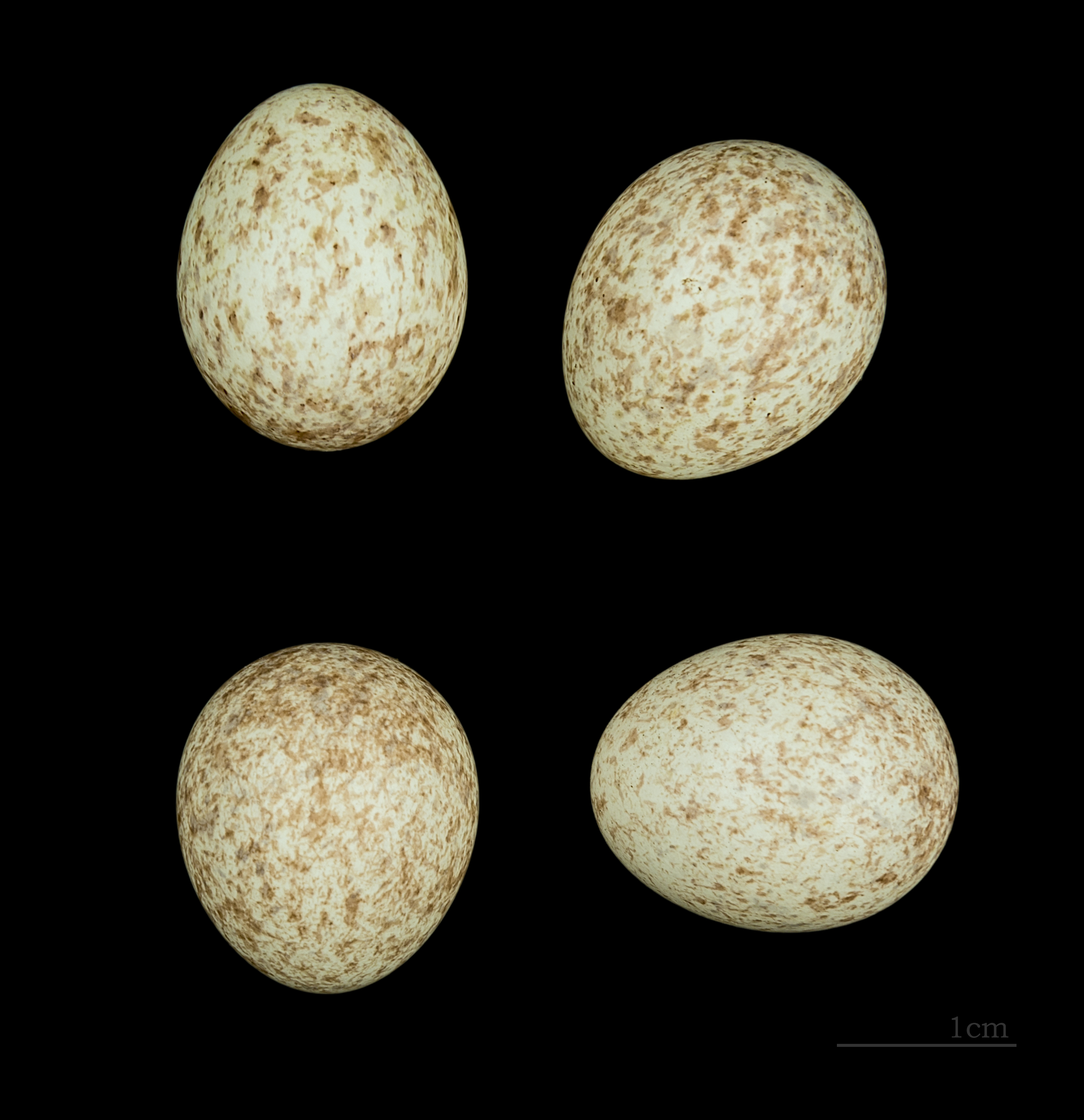
Emberiza fucata MHNT

== Subspecies ==
There are three subspecies. The nominate subspecies E. f. fucata occupies the northern part of the range. E.f. arcuata is found in the Himalayas and south-west and central parts of China; it is darker with broader breastbands. The third subspecies E. f. kuatunensis lives in south-east China and is darker and more rufous above with narrower breastbands.
