= Alléon =

Alléon is a French surname. Notable people with the surname include:

- Amédée Alléon (1838–1904), French-Ottoman nobleman and naturalist
- Jean-Louis Alléon-Dulac (1723–1788), French naturalist
