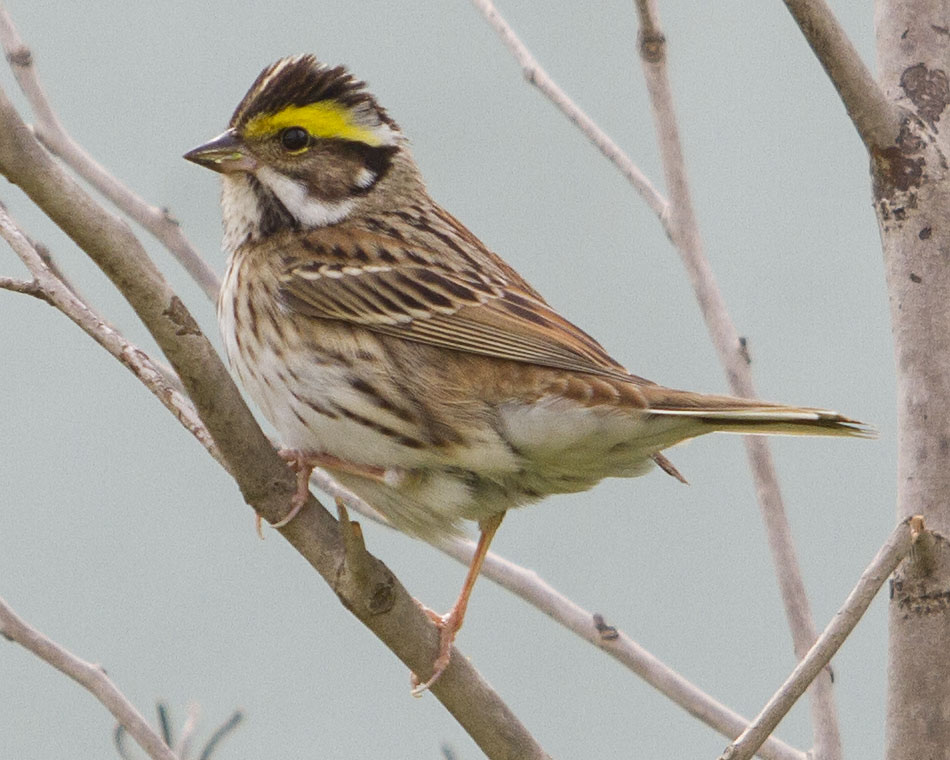

Conservation status
- Least Concern (IUCN 3.1)

Scientific classification
- Kingdom: Animalia
- Phylum: Chordata
- Class: Aves
- Order: Passeriformes
- Family: Emberizidae
- Genus: Schoeniclus
- Species: S. chrysophrys

Binomial name
- Schoeniclus chrysophrys (Pallas, 1776)

= Yellow-browed bunting =

Species of bird

The yellow-browed bunting (Schoeniclus chrysophrys) is a passerine bird in the family Emberizidae, a group now separated by most modern taxonomists from the finches in the family Fringillidae. It breeds in eastern Russia and winters in southern China

== Taxonomy ==
The specific chrysophrys is from Ancient Greek khrusophrus, "golden-browed".

This species was formerly placed in the genus Emberiza but in 2026 it was moved to the resurrected genus Schoeniclus based on the results of a 2021 molecular genetic study.

== Description ==
This bird is smaller than a common reed bunting, but is relatively large-headed. The upper parts are brown and heavily streaked, and the underparts are white with an orange hue on the flanks and some fine dark streaks. Their stout beaks are pink.

The breeding male has a black head with white crown and moustachial stripes and throat. There is a bright yellow eyebrow stripe. Females and young birds have a weaker head pattern, with brown instead of black, and can be confused with little buntings; however, there is always some yellow in the eyebrow, as well as at least a hint of a white stripe on the crown.

== Distribution ==
It breeds in eastern Siberia and is migratory, wintering in central and southern China. It is a very rare wanderer to western Europe.

== Breeding ==
The yellow-browed bunting breeds in the taiga zone, and lays four eggs in an arboreal nest. In the wild, the adults' diet consists of seeds, but they feed insects to nestlings.
