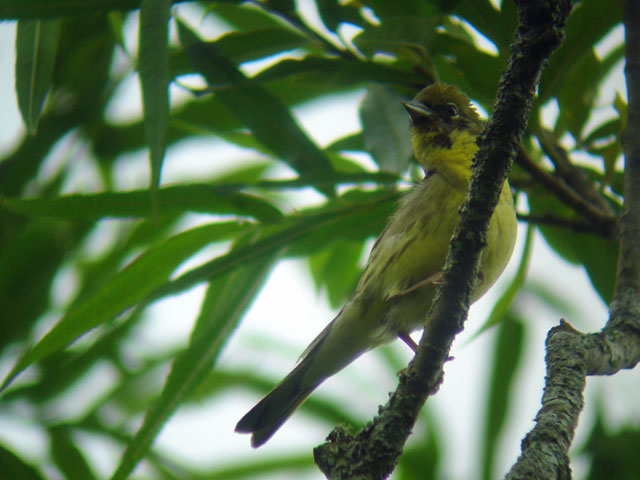

Conservation status
- Least Concern (IUCN 3.1)

Scientific classification
- Kingdom: Animalia
- Phylum: Chordata
- Class: Aves
- Order: Passeriformes
- Family: Emberizidae
- Genus: Schoeniclus
- Species: S. sulphuratus

Binomial name
- Schoeniclus sulphuratus (Temminck & Schlegel, 1848)

= Yellow bunting =

Species of bird

The name "yellow bunting" can also refer to the yellowhammer (Emberiza citrinella).

The yellow bunting or Japanese yellow bunting (Schoeniclus sulphuratus) is a small passerine bird of eastern Asia in the Old World bunting family Emberizidae. It is threatened by habitat loss, the use of pesticides and trapping for the cagebird industry.

This species was formerly placed in the genus Emberiza but in 2026 it was moved to the resurrected genus Schoeniclus based on the results of a 2021 molecular genetic study. Within the genus the yellow bunting is most closely related to the black-faced bunting (Schoeniclus spodocephalus).

== Description ==
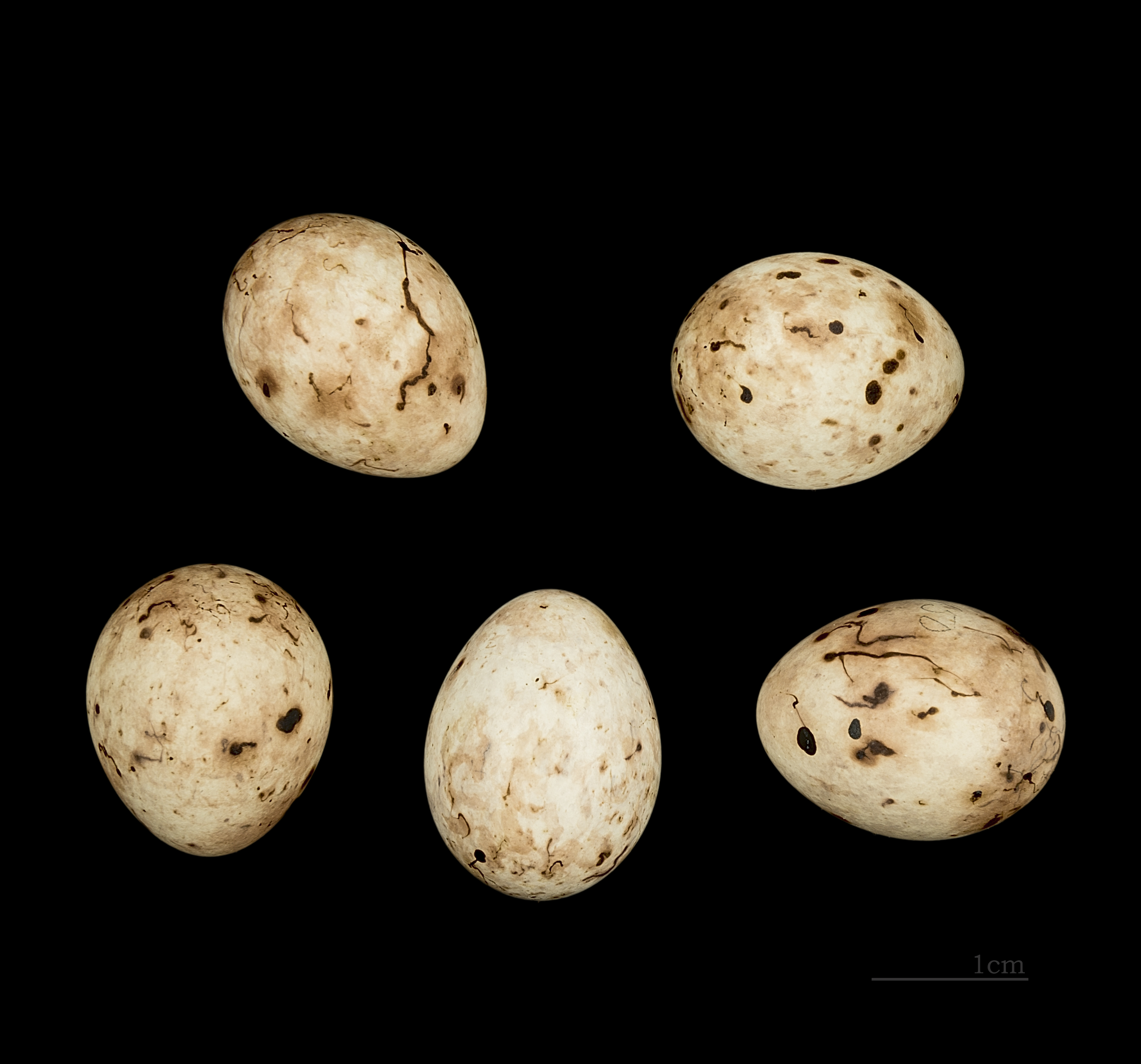
Eggs - MHNT

The yellow bunting is 14 cm long and has a conical, grey bill, pinkish-brown feet and brown eyes. The male is grey-green above with black streaks on the back. The underparts are yellow-green (brightest on the throat and belly) with streaks on the flanks. It has black lores, a narrow black chin, a pale eye ring and white outer tail feathers. There are two bars on the wing, formed by pale tips to the median and greater wing coverts. The female is similar to the male but paler without the black on the lores and chin. The species has a twittering song and a soft tsip call.

== Breeding ==
The breeding season lasts from mid-May to early July. The nest is built low in a bush and three to five eggs are laid.

== Habitat and conservation status ==
The yellow bunting breeds only in Japan where it is uncommon. It is found mainly on the largest island Honshu but may also breed on Kyushu and possibly bred on Hokkaido in the past. It occurs in forest and woodland between 600 and 1500 metres above sea level, mainly in the central and northern parts of Honshū. A few birds winter in the warmer regions of Japan but most migrate further south. It has been recorded from the Philippines, Taiwan, Hong Kong and south-east China at this season but is scarce everywhere. It occurs in woodland, scrub, grassland and farmland during winter. Small numbers pass through Korea on spring and autumn migration.

As of 2021, the total population of the yellow bunting remains unknown. It is considered stable or possibly increasing, and likely much larger than earlier estimates suggested. The species is classified as least concern by the IUCN. It is threatened by habitat loss, the use of pesticides and trapping for the cagebird industry.
