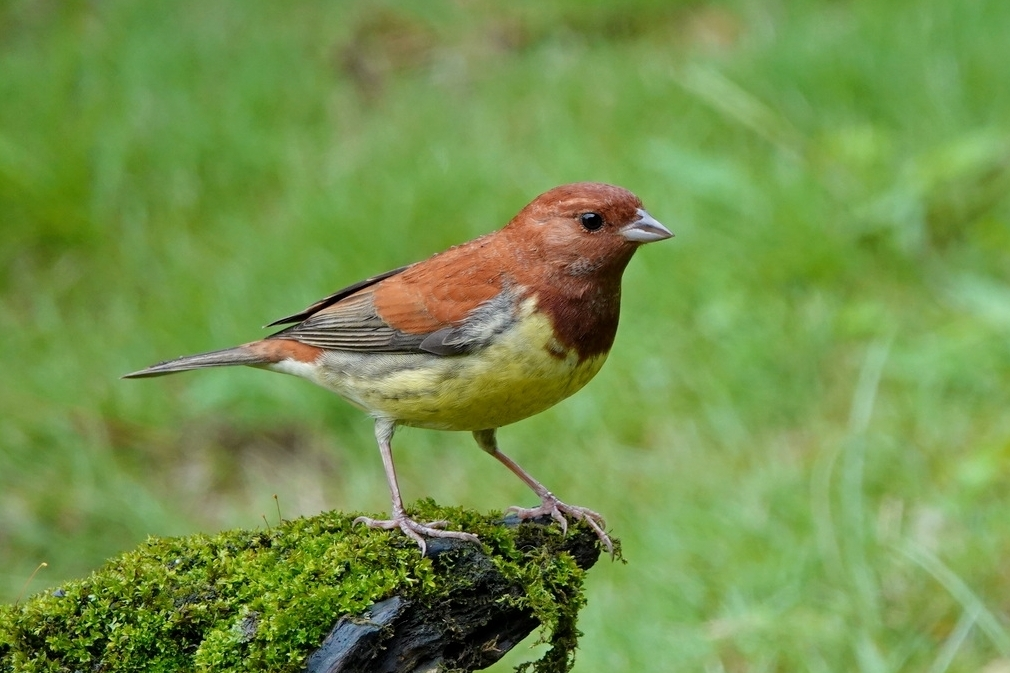

Conservation status
- Least Concern (IUCN 3.1)

Scientific classification
- Kingdom: Animalia
- Phylum: Chordata
- Class: Aves
- Order: Passeriformes
- Family: Emberizidae
- Genus: Schoeniclus
- Species: S. rutilus

Binomial name
- Schoeniclus rutilus (Pallas, 1776)

= Chestnut bunting =

Species of bird

The chestnut bunting (Schoeniclus rutilus) is a passerine bird in the Old World bunting family Emberizidae found in the east Palearctic.

This species was formerly placed in the genus Emberiza but in 2026 it was moved to the resurrected genus Schoeniclus based on the results of a 2021 molecular genetic study. Within the genus the chestnut bunting is most closely related to the yellow-breasted bunting (Schoeniclus aureolus).

== Description ==
The chestnut bunting is a fairly small bunting, 14 to 15 cm (5.5 to 5.9 in) in length. The tail is fairly short with little or no white on the outer feathers. Breeding males have bright chestnut-brown upperparts and head. The breast and belly are yellow with streaks on the sides. Non-breeding males are similar but duller with the chestnut partly hidden by pale fringes to the feathers. The female is mostly dull brown with dark streaks above while the underparts are mainly pale yellow. The rump is dull chestnut and the throat is buff.

The variable, high-pitched song is given from a perch low in a tree. The call is a short zick, similar to the call of the little bunting.

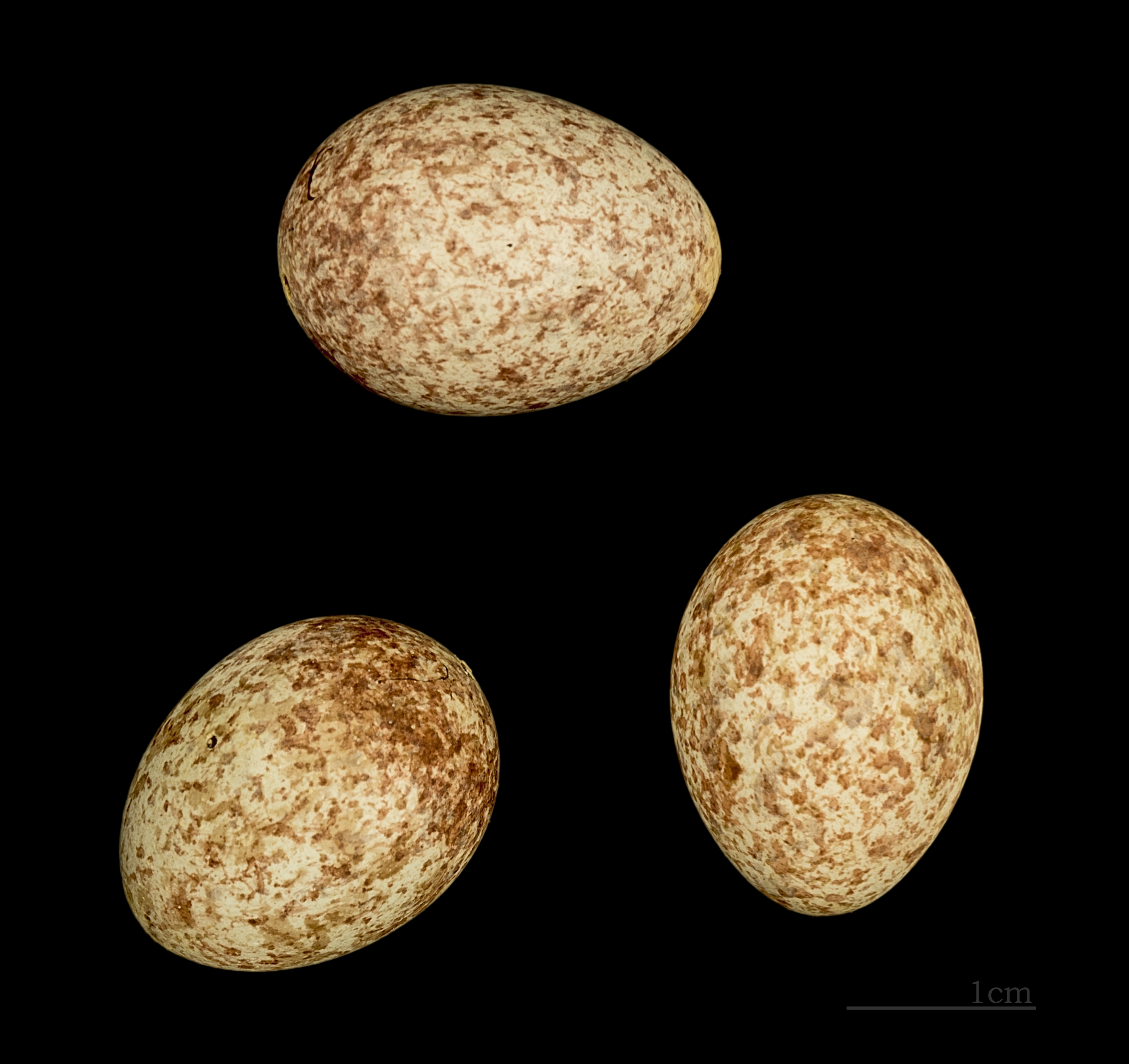
Eggs - MHNT

== Distribution and habitat ==
It breeds in Siberia, northern Mongolia and north-eastern China. It is a long-distance migrant, wintering in southern China, south-east Asia and north-east India. There are a number of records from Europe but some of these are considered to be escapes from captivity rather than genuine vagrants. During the breeding season it inhabits open forest with plenty of ground cover and shrubs. Wintering and migrating birds occur in farmland, scrub and woodland edges.
