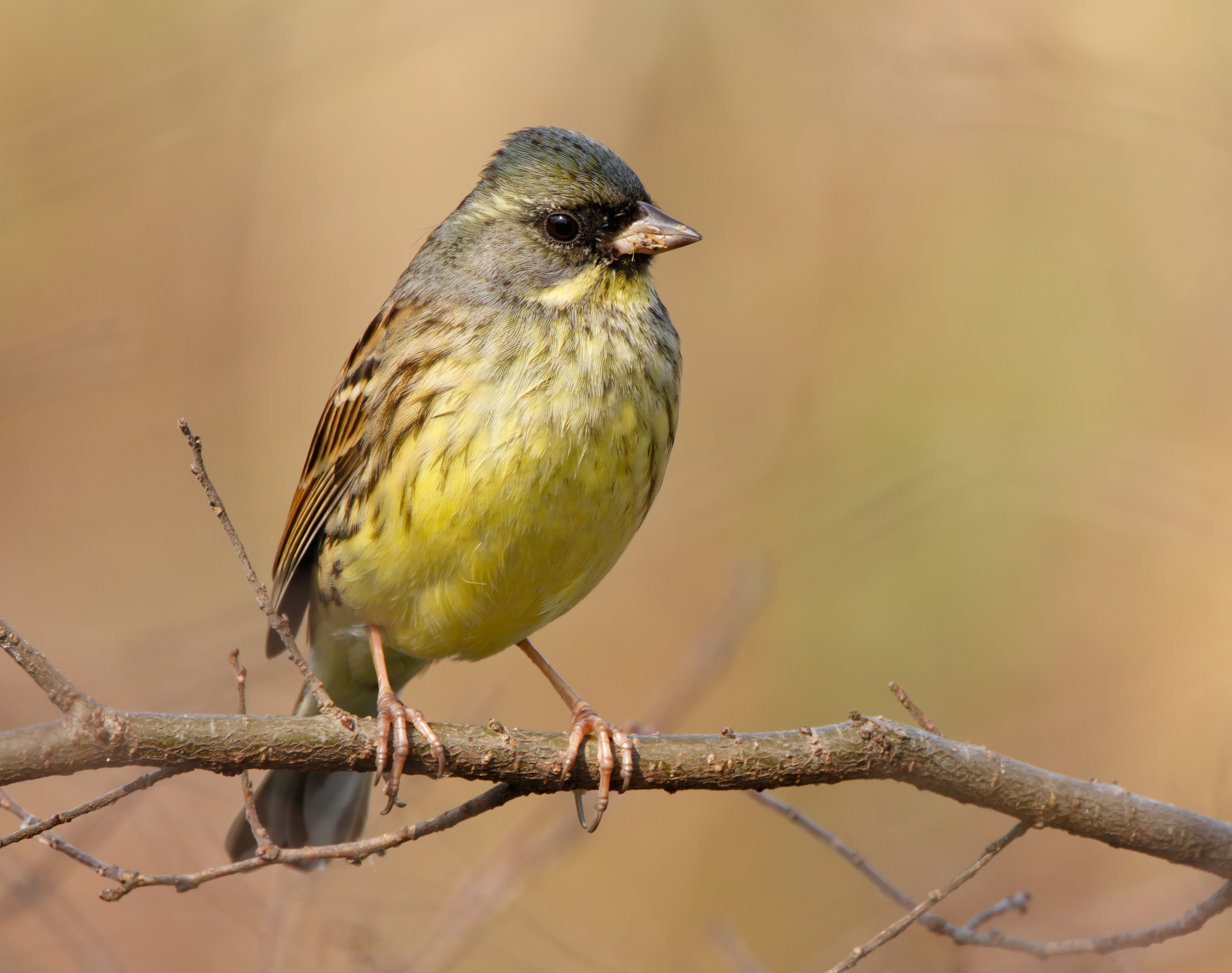
- Male in Sakai, Osaka

Conservation status
- Least Concern (IUCN 3.1)

Scientific classification
- Kingdom: Animalia
- Phylum: Chordata
- Class: Aves
- Order: Passeriformes
- Family: Emberizidae
- Genus: Schoeniclus
- Species: S. personatus

Binomial name
- Schoeniclus personatus (Temminck, 1836)

= Masked bunting =

Species of bird

The masked bunting (Schoeniclus personatus) is a passerine bird in the bunting family Emberizidae. It is found in Sakhalin, the Kuril Islands, and Japan.

The masked bunting was formerly considered as a subspecies of the black-faced bunting (Schoeniclus spodocephalus) but is now treated as a separate species based on morphological and genetic differences. The species is monotypic: no subspecies are recognised.

This species was formerly placed in the genus Emberiza but in 2026 it was moved to the resurrected genus Schoeniclus. This was based on the results of a 2021 molecular genetic study that included the black-faced bunting but not the masked bunting.
