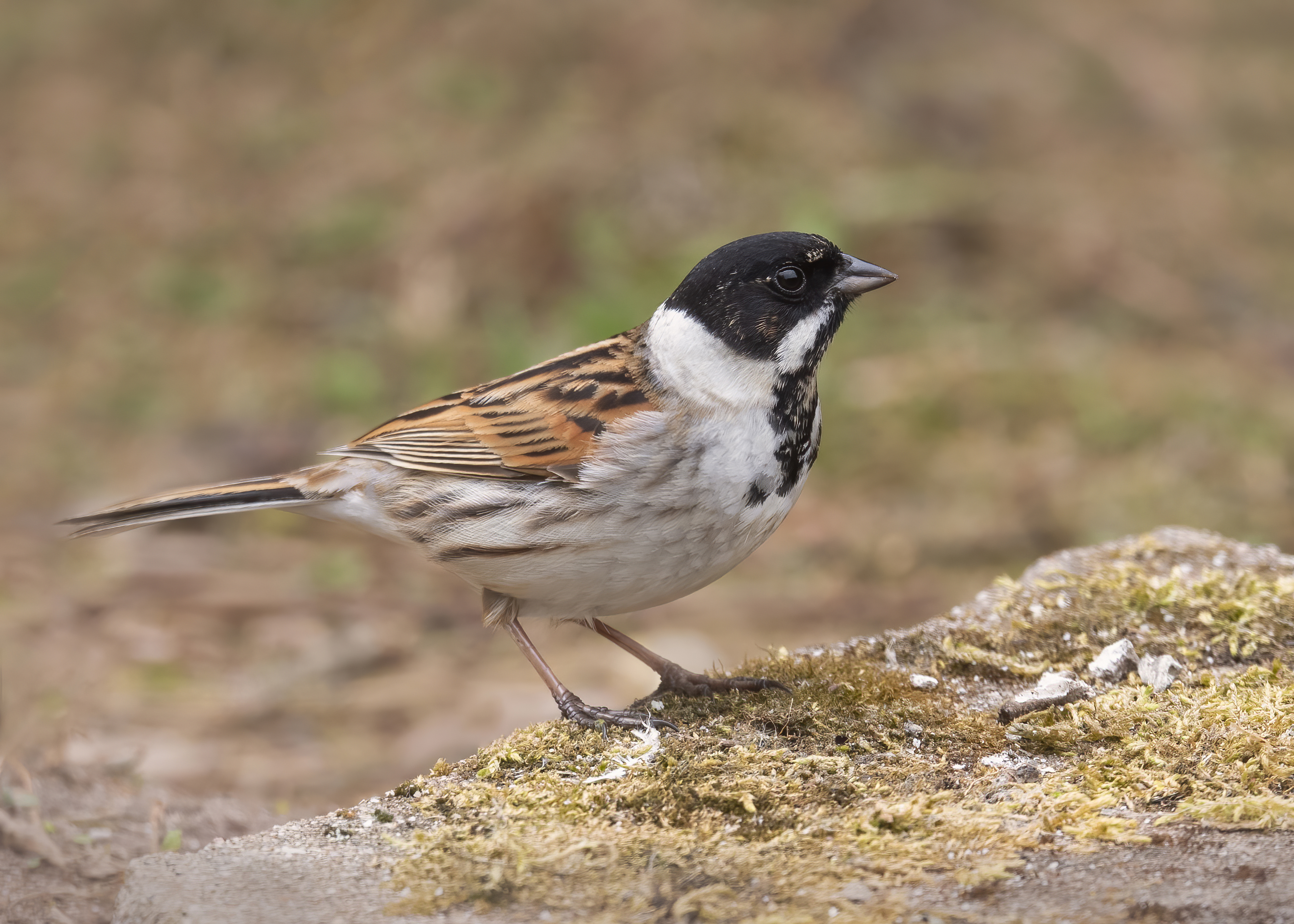
- Common reed bunting (Schoeniclus schoeniclus) (Male)

Scientific classification
- Kingdom: Animalia
- Phylum: Chordata
- Class: Aves
- Order: Passeriformes
- Family: Emberizidae
- Genus: Schoeniclus; Forster, 1817

Type species
- Emberiza arundinacea Gmelin, 1774=Fringilla schoeniclus Linnaeus, 1758

= Schoeniclus =

Genus of birds

Schoeniclus is a genus of Old World passerine birds in the family Emberizidae. Most of the species breed in the eastern Palearctic and migrate further south to winter. The exception is the common reed bunting that breeds across the Palearctic from Spain to the Kamchatka Peninsula in far eastern Russia. They are seed-eating birds with stubby, conical bills.

== Taxonomy ==
The genus Schoeniclus was introduced in 1817 by the English naturalist Thomas Forster to accommodate a single species, Emberiza arundinacea, that had been described in 1774 by the German naturalist Samuel Gottlieb Gmelin. This is the type species.

The taxon Emberiza arundinacea is synonymous with Emberiza pyrrhuloides Pallas, 1811, now a subspecies of the common reed bunting (Schoeniclus schoeniclus pyrrhuloides). The genus name Schoeniclus is from Ancient Greek σχοινικλος/skhoiniklos, an unidentified waterside bird.

The genus was formerly synonymized with the genus Emberiza that had been introduced by Linnaeus in 1758, but based on a molecular genetic study published in 2021, the genus was resurrected to contain 15 species.

The following cladogram shows the relationships between the species. It is based on the 2021 study by Tianlong Cai and collaborators. The phylogenetic position of the masked bunting, Schoeniclus personatus was not determined.

- Schoeniclus
  - - Yellow-throated bunting – Schoeniclus elegans
    - Slaty bunting – Schoeniclus siemsseni
  - - - Ochre-rumped bunting – Schoeniclus yessoensis
      - - Pallas's reed bunting – Schoeniclus pallasi
        - Common reed bunting – Schoeniclus schoeniclus
    - - - Yellow-browed bunting – Schoeniclus chrysophrys
        - - Tristram's bunting – Schoeniclus tristrami
          - Grey bunting – Schoeniclus variabilis
      - - - Yellow-breasted bunting – Schoeniclus aureolus
          - Chestnut bunting – Schoeniclus rutilus
        - - - Little bunting – Schoeniclus pusillus
            - Rustic bunting – Schoeniclus rusticus
          - - Black-faced bunting – Schoeniclus spodocephalus
            - Yellow bunting – Schoeniclus sulphuratus

The genus contains the following 15 species:

Image	Common name	Scientific name	Distribution
	Slaty bunting	Schoeniclus siemsseni	mountains of central China
	Yellow-throated bunting	Schoeniclus elegans	eastern Asia
	Ochre-rumped bunting	Schoeniclus yessoensis	eastern China, Korea and Japan
	Pallas's reed bunting	Emberiza pallasi	northeast European Russia to China
	Common reed bunting	Schoeniclus schoeniclus	Palearctic, from Spain to Japan
	Yellow-browed bunting	Schoeniclus chrysophrys	breeds in eastern Russia; winters in southern China
	Tristram's bunting	Schoeniclus tristrami	breeds in far eastern Russia; breeds in southern China
	Grey bunting	Schoeniclus variabilis	breeds southern Kamchatka Peninsula, Sakhalin, Kuril Islands; winters in Japan
	Chestnut bunting	Schoeniclus rutilus	eastern Asia
	Yellow-breasted bunting	Schoeniclus aureolus	breeds from western Russia to far eastern Russia; winters in Nepal eastward through southeastern Asia (except southern Malayan Peninsula) and southeastern China
	Little bunting	Schoeniclus pusillus	breeds tundra and taiga of northern Eurasia from Scandinavia eastward to Chukotka, and southward to northeastern China; winters from east-central India to eastern China and Korea Peninsula and Taiwan
	Rustic bunting	Schoeniclus rusticus	breeds northern Palearctic from Scandinavia eastward to Kamchatka Peninsula and Sakhalin; winters to eastern China, southern Japan, Korea Peninsula, and Taiwan
	Yellow bunting	Schoeniclus sulphuratus	breeds in central and northern Japan; winters in northern Philippines
	Masked bunting	Schoeniclus personatus	breeds Sakhalin and southern Kuril Islands to Honshu and Shikoku; winters southern Japan
	Black-faced bunting	Schoeniclus spodocephalus	breeds in eastern Russia and Mongolia; winters in southern China, northern Vietnam, northern Laos and northern Myanmar
