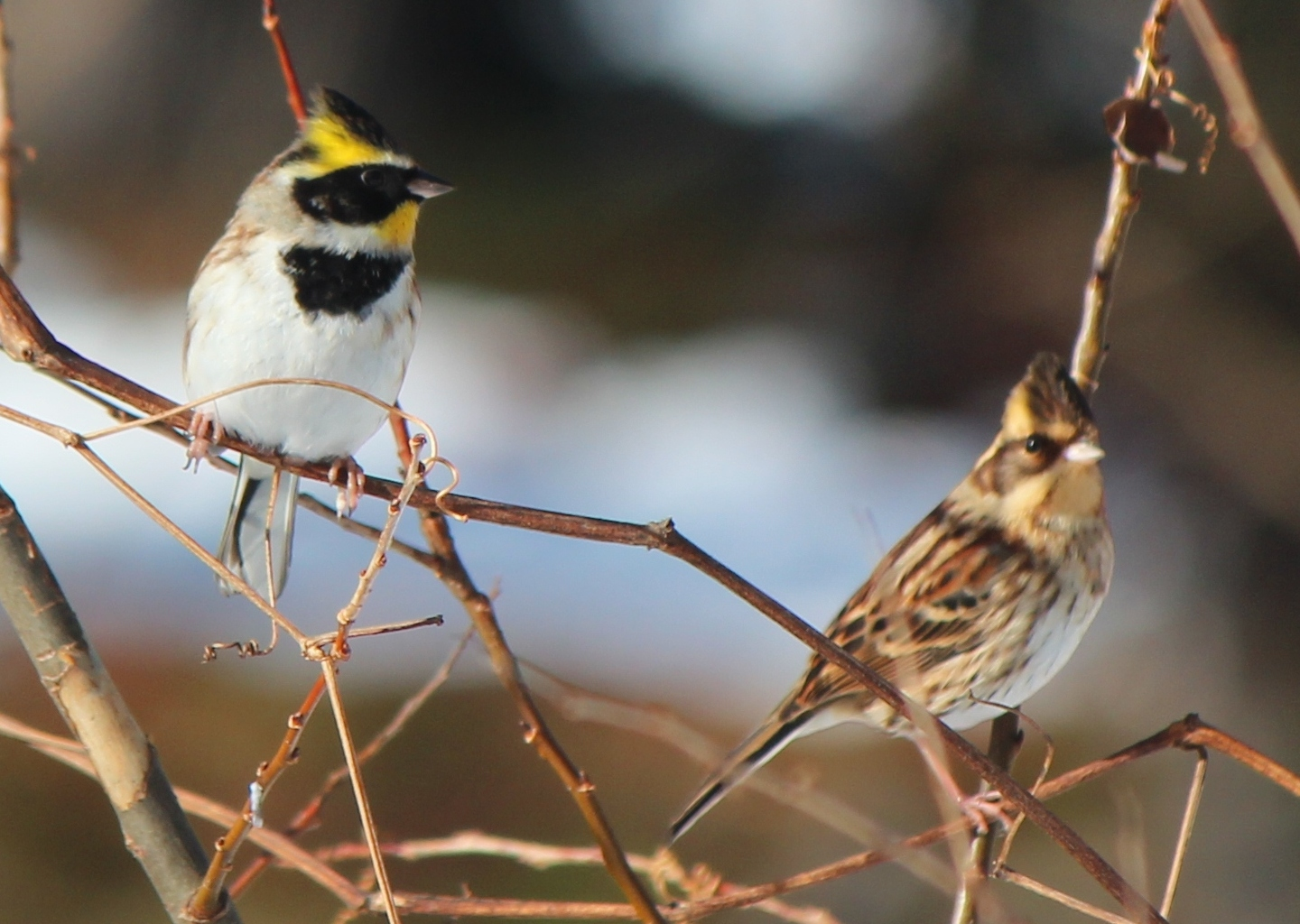

Conservation status
- Least Concern (IUCN 3.1)

Scientific classification
- Kingdom: Animalia
- Phylum: Chordata
- Class: Aves
- Order: Passeriformes
- Family: Emberizidae
- Genus: Schoeniclus
- Species: S. elegans

Binomial name
- Schoeniclus elegans (Temminck, 1836)

= Yellow-throated bunting =

Species of bird

The yellow-throated bunting (Schoeniclus elegans), also known as the elegant bunting, is a species of bird in the family Emberizidae.

It is found in China, Japan, Korea, Myanmar, Russia, and Taiwan. Its natural habitats are temperate forests and subtropical or tropical dry forests.

Emberiza elegans follows Type II chain migration. Research on isotopes from feathers has revealed that northern populations begin migration before southern populations. Additionally, a latitudinal gradient in hydrogen isotopes suggest that northern breeders spend winters further north than their southern counterparts.

== Taxonomy ==
The yellow-throated bunting was formerly placed in the genus Emberiza. In 2026 it was moved to the resurrected genus Schoeniclus based on the results of a 2021 molecular genetic study.

Two subspecies are recognised:

- S. e. elegans (Temminck, 1836) – northeastern China through Korea Peninsula and west-central Japan; winters northeastern China and southern Japan to eastern China
- S. e. elegantulus (Swinhoe, 1870) – central China; winters southward to northeastern Myanmar
