= Amédée Alléon =

French nobleman, naturalist, taxidermist and artist (1830–1904)

Count Jean Gérard Amédée Alléon
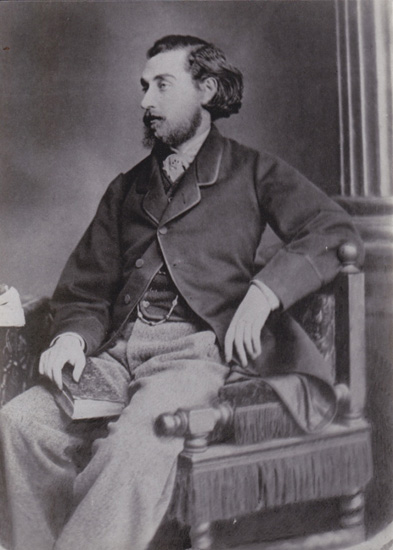
- Born: 8 October 1838; Buyuk-Déré, Turkey
- Died: 16 January 1904 (aged 65); Makrikeuy, Turkey
- Citizenship: France
- Occupations: Naturalist, taxidermist and artist

Count Jean Gérard Amédée Alléon (8 October 1838 – 16 January 1904) was a French nobleman, naturalist, taxidermist and artist who lived in the Ottoman Empire. He noted the migrations of birds of prey in the Bosporus Straits and wrote on the birds of the region.

== Biography ==
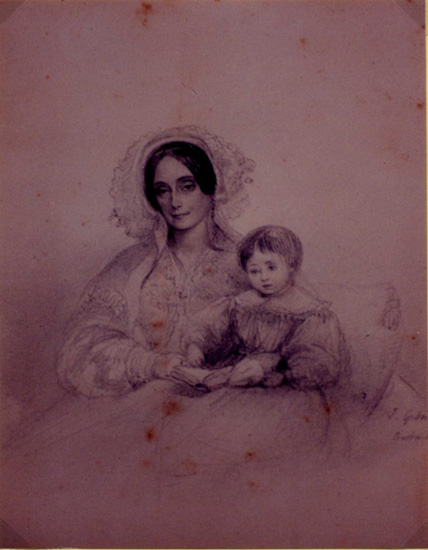
Amédée as a child with his mother

Alléon was born in Buyuk-Déré, near Istanbul (Constantinople), the son of Count Jacques Alléon (1792–1876), a Galata banker in the Ottoman Empire, and Marie Marion. He took an interest in nature and art at an early age with a talent for music and drawing. The family owned land and real estate and he became a shareholder of the English railroad company. He produced a number of artworks, and also made a collection of mounted bird specimens. In 1863 he married Madeleine Asselin de Villequier-Alléon (1844–1911) and they had five children including Maurice and Abel who were involved in natural history. He worked with Jules Vian of the French zoological society, sending many specimens to France. The English naturalist H. J. Elwes stayed with Alléon when he passed through Constantinople in 1870. In 1864, he donated a large set of his collections to the Ottoman government and in 1899, some to the Lazarist College in Constantinople. Some specimens were sold to the Royal Museum in Sofia, Bulgaria. His taxidermic works were exhibited at Vienna (1884) and Paris (1889) winning acclaim. In 1889 he wrote a book on taxidermic methods illustrated by his own plates. He studied the migration of the birds of prey along the Bosporus from Büyükdere and built a chalet at Demirdji to study the local birds. He noted a decline in the avifauna following the Crimean War (1853–56). He also collected beetles, some of which are held in the Natural History Museum in Sofia.

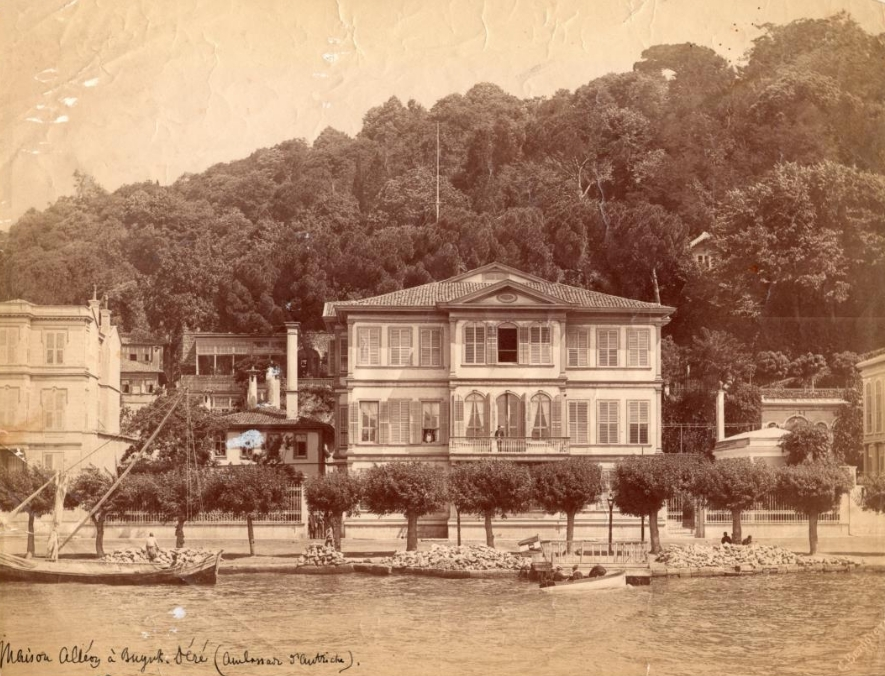
Alléon's mansion at Büyükdere

He was elected to the International Ornithological Council of Vienna in 1884. He was made Commander of the Order of Civil Merit of Bulgaria, the Imperial Order of the Medjidie, and an officer of the Order of Pius IX. He died from a stroke at Makrikeuy near Constantinople. A species of bunting Emberiza alleonis was named after him by Vian in 1869 but this is considered a synonym of Emberiza pallasi. Many of his paintings held in Sofia were destroyed by bombs in World War II.

Some of his publications include:

- Alleon A. (1880). "Catalogue des Oiseaux observes aux environs de Constantinople". Bull. Soc. Zool. France. 5: 80–116.
- Alleon A. (1886). "Memoire sur les oiseaux dans la Dobrudja et al Bulgarie". Ornis. 2: 397–428.
- Alleon A. (1889). Nouveaux procedes de taxidermie experimentes et decrits par M. Amedee Alleon membre des Societes zoologique et entomologique de France et de Comite international permanent d'ornithologie. Notice accompagnee de Planches executees sur des oiseaux montes par l'auteur. Paris.
- Alleon A. (1898). Nouveaux procedes de taxidermie: accompagnees de quelques impressions ornithologique, de photographies des principaux types de la collection de l'auteur a MakriKeui, pres Constantinople, et de rapaces sur nature. Paris.
- Alleon A.; Vian J. (1869). "Des migrations des oiseaux de proie sur le Bosphore de Constantinople". Revue et magasin de zoologie pure et appliquée. 2. 21: 258–273, 305–315, 342–348, 369–374, 401–409.
- Alleon A.; Vian J. (1870). "Des migrations des oiseaux de proie sur le Bosphore de Constantinople: nouvelles observations". Revue et magasin de zoologie pure et appliquée. 2. 22: 81–86, 129–138, 161–165.
- Alleon A.; Vian J. (1873). "Explorations ornithologiques sur les rives europeennes du Bosphore". Revue et magasin de zoologie pure et appliquée. 3. 1: 235–262.
- Alleon A.; Vian J. (1876). "Explorations ornithologiques sur les rives europeennes du Bosphore". Revue et magasin de zoologie pure et appliquée. 3. 4: 1–5.
