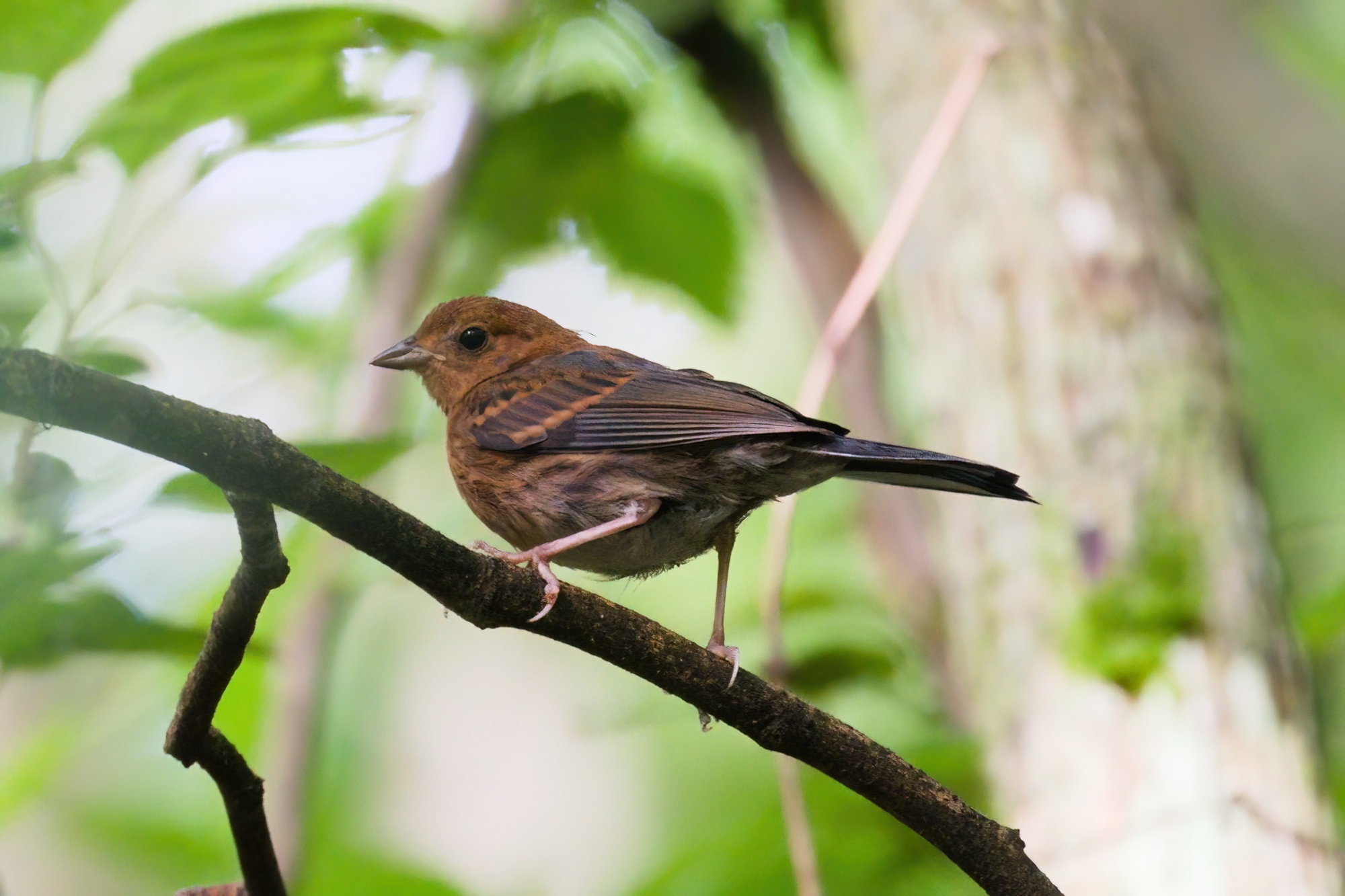
- Female
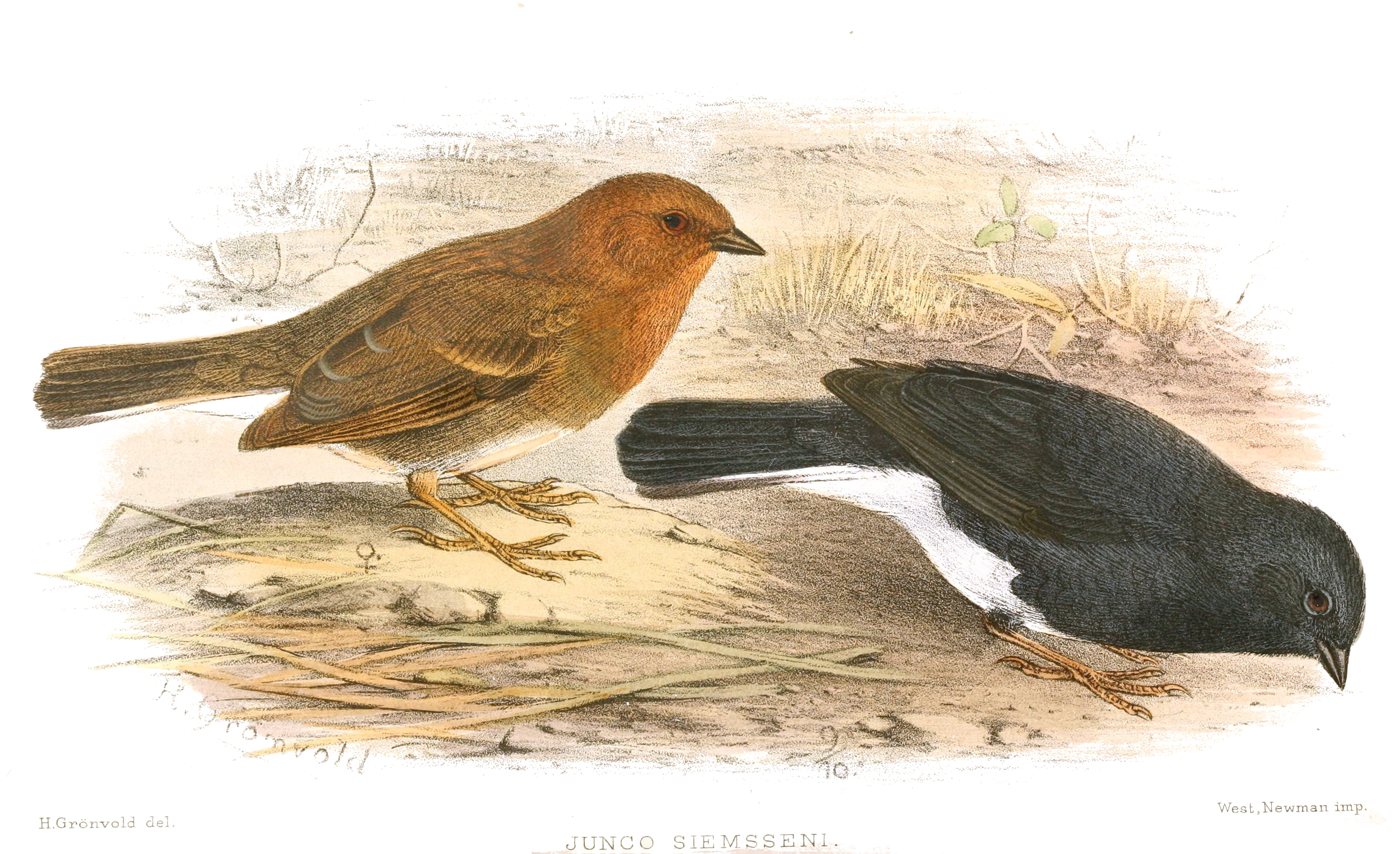
- Illustration of female (left) and male (right)

Conservation status
- Least Concern (IUCN 3.1)

Scientific classification
- Kingdom: Animalia
- Phylum: Chordata
- Class: Aves
- Order: Passeriformes
- Family: Emberizidae
- Genus: Schoeniclus
- Species: S. siemsseni

Binomial name
- Schoeniclus siemsseni (Martens GH, 1906)

Synonyms
- Latoucheornis siemsseni

= Slaty bunting =

Species of bird

The slaty bunting (Schoeniclus siemsseni) is a species of bird in the family Emberizidae.

This species was formerly placed in the genus Emberiza. In 2026 it was moved to the resurrected genus Schoeniclus based on the results of a 2021 molecular genetic study.

== Description ==
An adult slaty bunting measures 13 centimetres (5.1 in) in length and weighs 20 grams (0.71 oz). The plumages are brown and highly distinctive with unusual tail feathers which are broad towards the tip. Its bill is comparatively small and neat.

== Distribution and habitat ==
It is endemic to China. Its natural habitat is subtropical or tropical moist shrubland.

== Food and feeding ==
Slaty bunting's diet includes seeds, insects, and other small invertebrates.

== Conservation status ==
The population of slaty bunting is not globally threatened. However, migration and clearing of vegetation for agriculture are some of the threats facing this species in China.
