= Emberizidae =

- Yellowhammer; Emberiza citrinella

Scientific classification
- Kingdom: Animalia
- Phylum: Chordata
- Class: Aves
- Order: Passeriformes
- Superfamily: Emberizoidea
- Family: Emberizidae; Vigors, 1831

Genera
- see text

Family of passerine birds

The Old World buntings are a family, Emberizidae, of Old World seed-eating passerine birds with distinctively finch-like bills. In Europe, most species are simply called buntings. Several New World genera formerly considered part of this family are now placed in the families Passerellidae and Thraupidae.

== Description ==
Emberizids are small birds, typically around 15 cm in length, with finch-like bills and nine primary feathers. They live in a variety of habitats, including woodland, brush, marsh, and grassland. They tend to have brown-streaked plumage. Many species have distinctive head patterns.

== Behaviour and ecology ==
Their diet consists mainly of seeds, but may be supplemented with insects, especially when feeding their young.

The habits of emberizids are similar to those of finches, with which they sometimes used to be grouped. Older sources may place some emberizids in the Fringillidae family, and the common names of some emberizids still refer to them as finches. With a few exceptions, emberizids build cup-shaped nests from grasses and other plant fibres, and are monogamous.

== Taxonomy and systematics ==
The genera of New World sparrows were split from Emberizidae as of July 5, 2017 by the American Ornithological Society; they are now considered to constitute their own family, Passerellidae.

A comprehensive 2021 genetic study that incorporated DNA samples of all but two Emberizidae species found that the family's ancestor came from the New World, from where it colonised eastern Asia via the Bering Strait during the late Miocene. From there, the family then radiated into four clades, each of which is now treated as a genus. This radiation was linked to a global cooling event that led to a reduction of forest cover and the expansion of open habitats, including grasslands, to which the Emberizidae buntings adapted. The genus Fringillaria is primarily African and includes mostly resident species such as the golden-breasted bunting, the Cape bunting, and the house bunting. The next clade to diverge, Schoeniclus, is strongly migratory, and adapted to open taiga forests. This clade includes the yellow-breasted and the little bunting, but also the common reed bunting and Pallas's reed bunting, which breed near standing water. The third clade, the genus Melophus is the smallest, comprising three species, and is found in arid regions of South Asia; it includes the crested bunting, the red-headed bunting and the black-headed bunting. The fourth clade, the genus Emberiza, comprises sedentary, partially migratory and strongly migratory species, most of which are adapted to drylands and shrublands. Examples include the yellowhammer, the corn bunting, the meadow bunting, and the ortolan bunting.

The following cladogram shows the relationships between the genera. It is based on the results of 2021 study by Tianlong Cai and collaborators.

- Emberizidae
  - Fringillaria – 11 species
  - - Schoeniclus – 15 species
    - - Melophus – 3 species
      - Emberiza – 15 species

== Species ==
The family contains 44 species in four genera.

Fringillaria

- Cabanis's bunting, Fringillaria cabanisi
- Golden-breasted bunting, Fringillaria flaviventris
- Somali bunting, Fringillaria poliopleura
- Brown-rumped bunting, Fringillaria affinis
- Cape bunting, Fringillaria capensis
- Lark-like bunting, Fringillaria impetuani
- Socotra bunting, Fringillaria socotrana
- House bunting, Fringillaria sahari
- Striolated bunting, Fringillaria striolata
- Gosling's bunting, Fringillaria goslingi
- Cinnamon-breasted bunting, Fringillaria tahapisi

Schoeniclus

- Slaty bunting, Schoeniclus siemsseni
- Yellow-throated bunting, Schoeniclus elegans
- Ochre-rumped bunting, Schoeniclus yessoensis
- Pallas's reed bunting, Schoeniclus pallasi
- Common reed bunting, Schoeniclus schoeniclus
- Yellow-browed bunting, Schoeniclus chrysophrys
- Tristram's bunting, Schoeniclus tristrami
- Grey bunting, Schoeniclus variabilis
- Chestnut bunting, Schoeniclus rutilus
- Yellow-breasted bunting, Schoeniclus aureolus
- Little bunting, Schoeniclus pusillus
- Rustic bunting, Schoeniclus rusticus
- Yellow bunting, Schoeniclus sulphuratus
- Masked bunting, Schoeniclus personatus
- Black-faced bunting, Schoeniclus spodocephalus

Melophus

- Crested bunting, Melophus lathami
- Black-headed bunting, Melophus melanocephalus
- Red-headed bunting, Melophus bruniceps

Emberiza

- Corn bunting, Emberiza calandra
- Chestnut-eared bunting, Emberiza fucata
- Tibetan bunting, Emberiza koslowi
- Jankowski's bunting, Emberiza jankowskii
- Meadow bunting, Emberiza cioides
- Godlewski's bunting, Emberiza godlewskii
- Rock bunting, Emberiza cia
- Grey-necked bunting, Emberiza buchanani
- Cinereous bunting, Emberiza cineracea
- Ortolan bunting, Emberiza hortulana
- Cretzschmar's bunting, Emberiza caesia
- Cirl bunting, Emberiza cirlus
- White-capped bunting, Emberiza stewarti
- Pine bunting, Emberiza leucocephalos
- Yellowhammer, Emberiza citrinella
