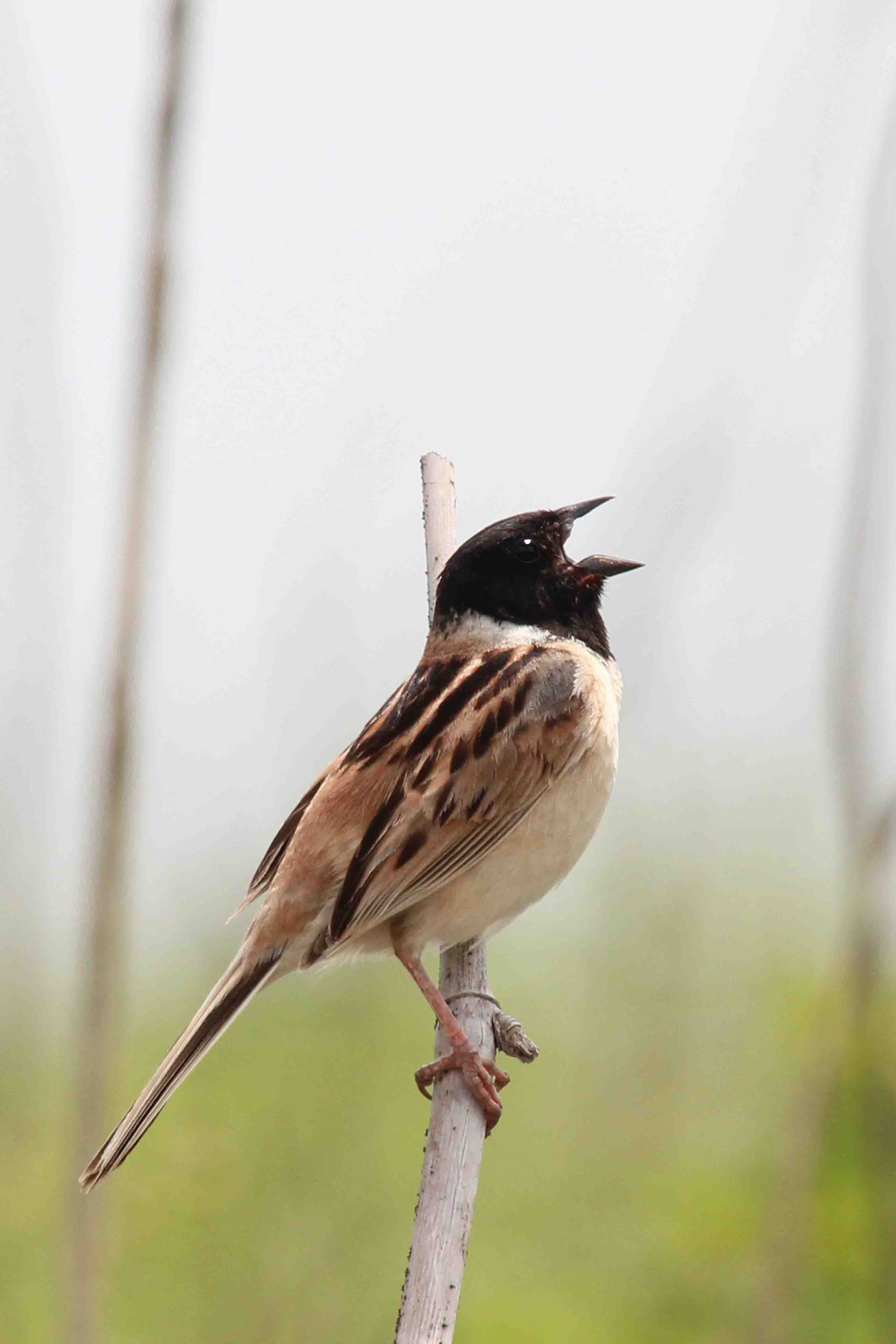

Conservation status
- Near Threatened (IUCN 3.1)

Scientific classification
- Kingdom: Animalia
- Phylum: Chordata
- Class: Aves
- Order: Passeriformes
- Family: Emberizidae
- Genus: Schoeniclus
- Species: S. yessoensis

Binomial name
- Schoeniclus yessoensis (Swinhoe, 1874)

Synonyms
- Schœnicolus yessoënsis R. Swinhoe, 1874

= Ochre-rumped bunting =

Species of bird

The ochre-rumped bunting (Schoeniclus yessoensis), also known as the Japanese reed bunting, is a bird in the family Emberizidae. It is found in Manchuria, Korea and Japan. Its natural habitats are temperate grassland and swamps. It is threatened by habitat loss. In South Korea it is classified as an endangered species.

== Taxonomy ==
The bird family Emberizidae contains 44 seed-eating species confined to the Old World. The ochre-rumped bunting was first described as Schoenicola yessoensis by Robert Swinhoe in 1874. The species epithet, yessoensis, describes the bird as being found on Yesso (Hokkaido).

This species was formerly placed in the genus Emberiza. In 2026 it was moved to the resurrected genus Schoeniclus based on the results of a 2021 molecular genetic study. Within its genus, the ochre-rumped bunting is most closely related to the common reed bunting and Pallas's reed bunting.

Two subspecies are recognised:

- S. y. yessoensis (Swinhoe, 1874) – breeds in central and southern Japan; winters in southern Japan and Korea Peninsula
- S. y. continentalis (Witherby, 1913) – breeds in far eastern Mongolia, northeastern China (Heilongjiang), and southern Russian Far East; winters in coastal eastern China

== Description ==
It is 15 cm in length. Typically, it is the richest-coloured of the reed buntings, with the pinkest legs and bill in winter. Adult males have a dark back, chestnut upperparts, and are striped black and buff on the breast and sides. They have a brown nape, and the sides of neck are whitish. Females have a buffy submoustachial and throat, black malar stripes, and a dark brown crown with pale streaking. Juveniles have a pale greyish-brown central crown stripe and a yellowish brown rump. The calls of the ochre-rumped bunting can be transcribed as 'sur-swee-ik' and 'tik'.
