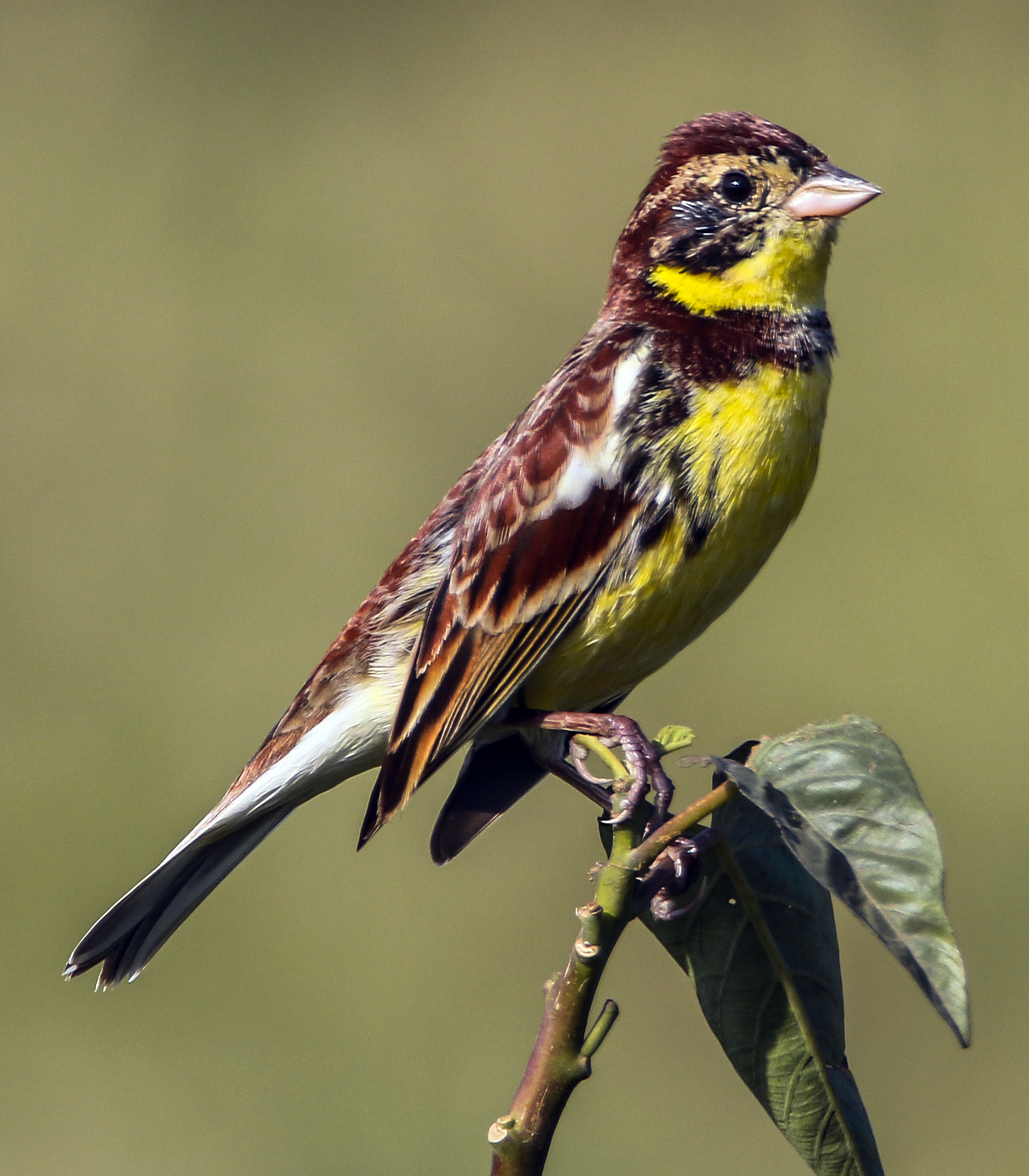
- Male in Nepal

Conservation status
- Critically Endangered (IUCN 3.1)

Scientific classification
- Kingdom: Animalia
- Phylum: Chordata
- Class: Aves
- Order: Passeriformes
- Family: Emberizidae
- Genus: Schoeniclus
- Species: S. aureolus

Binomial name
- Schoeniclus aureolus (Pallas, 1773); Irtysh River, Siberia
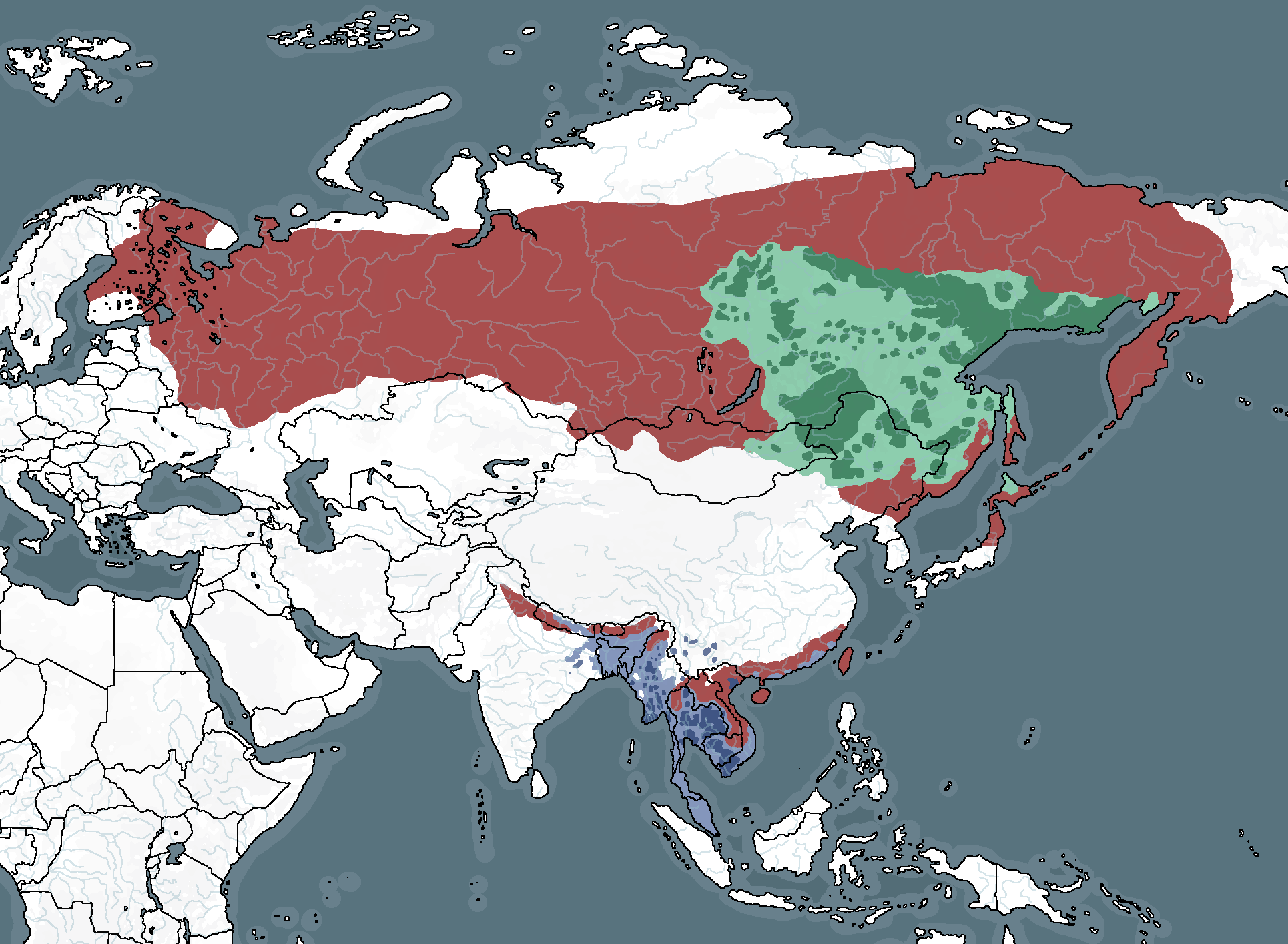
- Breeding summer range overwintering Contracted range (extirpated)

= Yellow-breasted bunting =

Species of bird

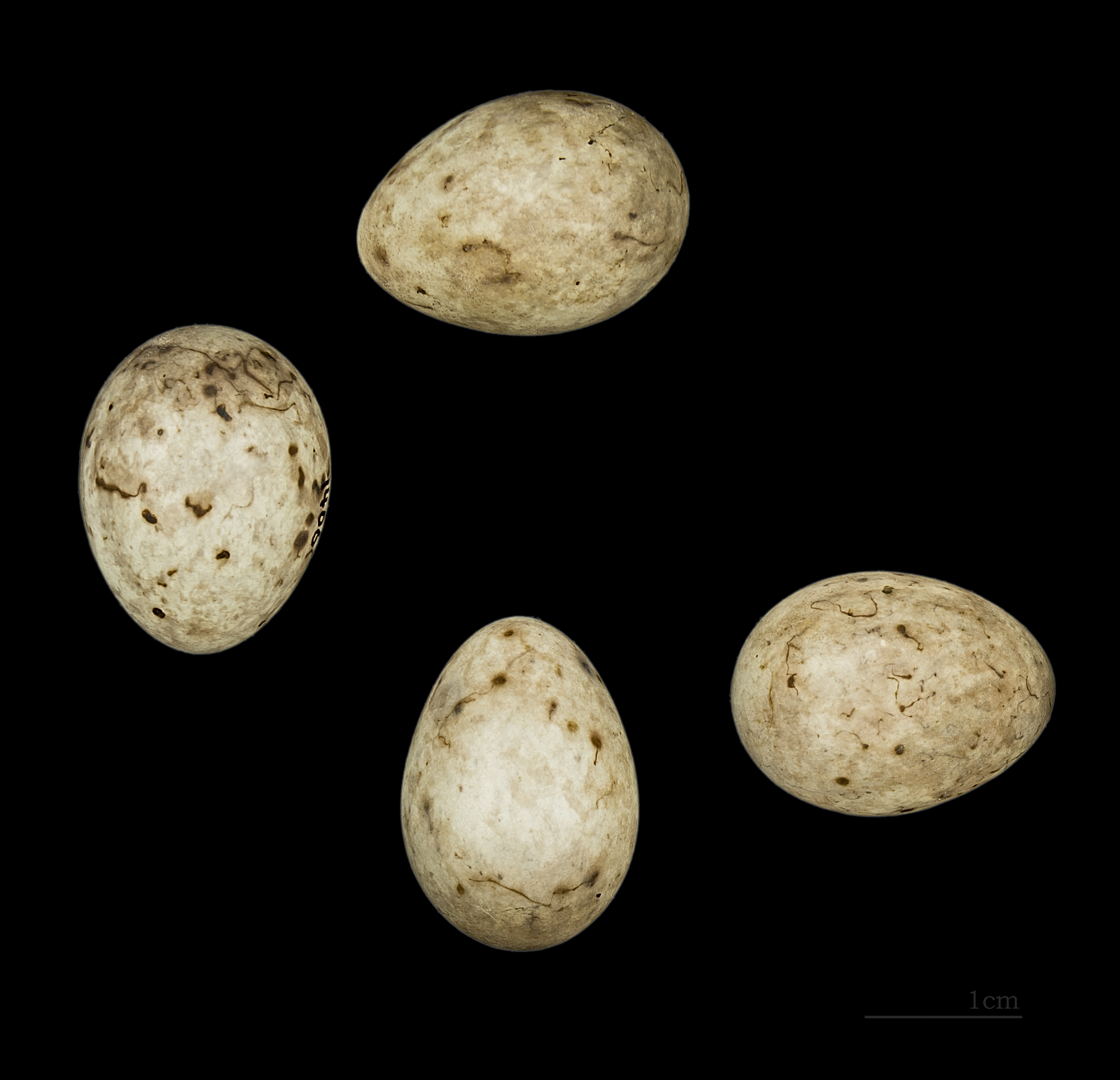
Eggs MHNT

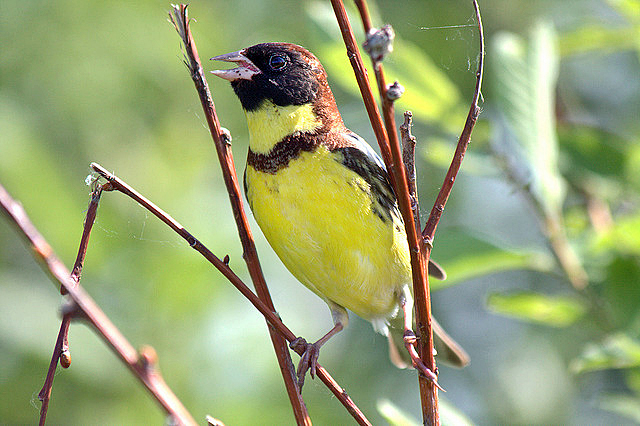
Yellow-breasted bunting (breeding male)

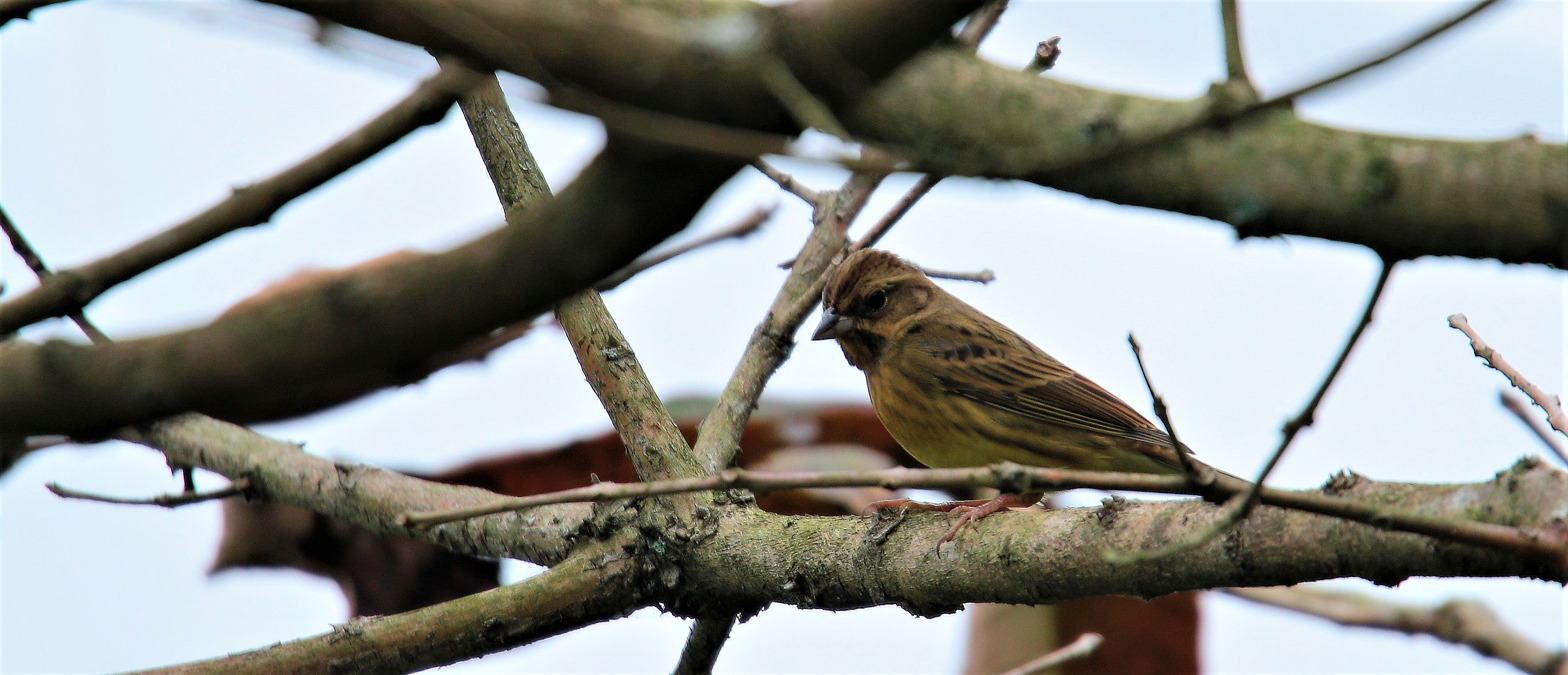
Yellow-breasted bunting (female)

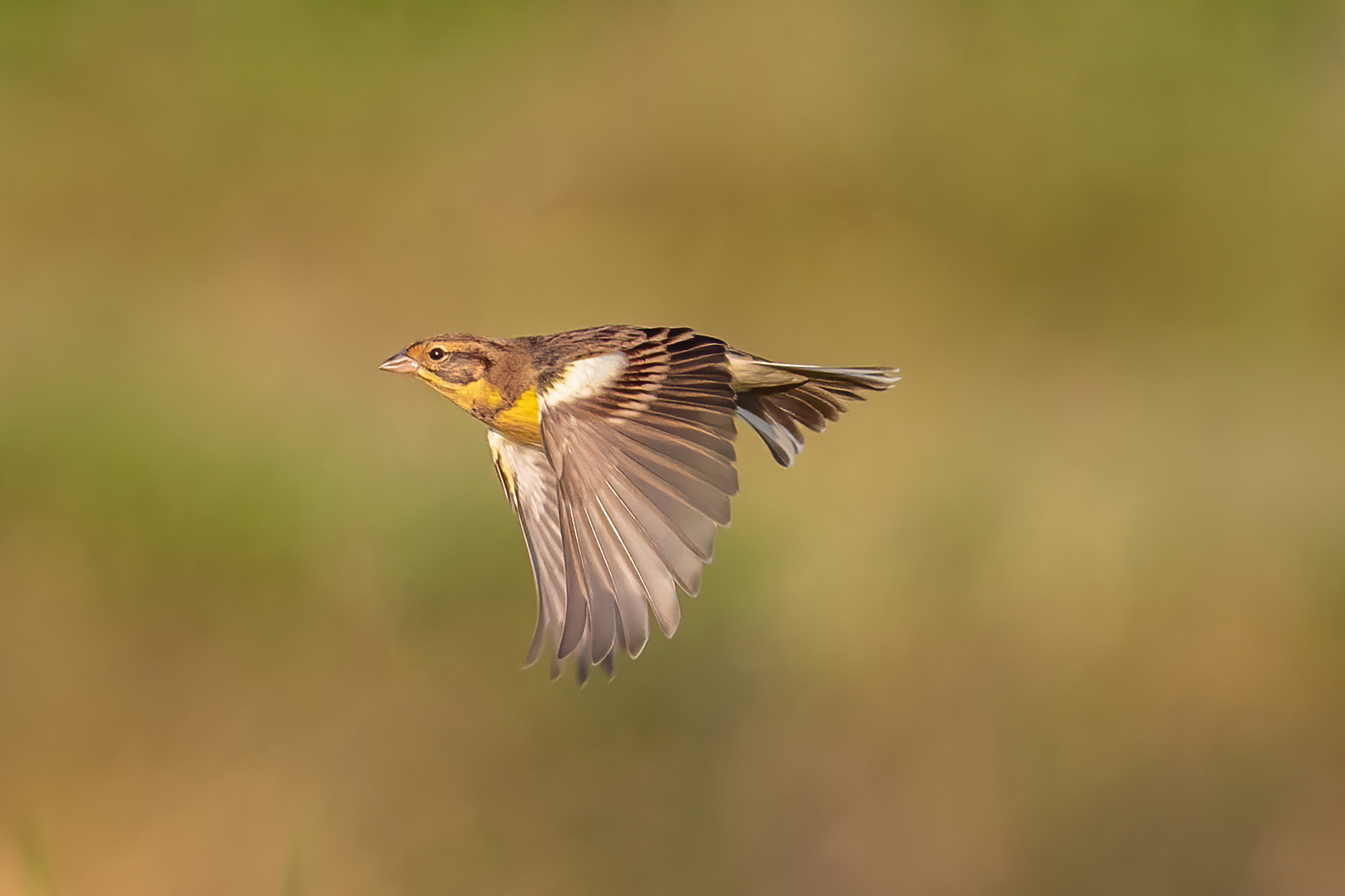
Yellow-breasted bunting in flight

The yellow-breasted bunting (Schoeniclus aureolus) is a passerine bird in the Old World bunting family Emberizidae that is found across the Boreal and East Palearctic. The specific aureola is Latin for "golden". The bird's call is a distinctive zick, and the song is a clear tru-tru, tri-tri.

Until 2004, the International Union for Conservation of Nature considered the yellow-breasted bunting to be a species of least concern. Since 2004, it has been gradually upgraded to a status of Critically Endangered due to rapid drops in population sizes. It is subject to heavy hunting pressure in China, through which most specimens pass during migration.

== Taxonomy ==
This species was formerly placed in the genus Emberiza but in 2026 it was moved to the resurrected genus Schoeniclus based on the results of a 2021 molecular genetic study. Within the genus, the yellow-breasted bunting is most closely related to the chestnut bunting (Schoeniclus rutila).

Two subspecies are recognised:

- S. a. aureolus (Pallas, 1773) – breeds Murmansk Oblast (far northwestern Russia; formerly eastern Finland) eastward to eastern Siberia and southward to far northern Kazakhstan and central Mongolia; winters southern and southeastern Asia
- S. a. ornatus (Shulpin, 1928) – breeds south-central Siberia and northeastern Mongolia, northeastern China, and far northern Hokkaido (northern Japan); winters southern and southeastern Asia and southern China

== Description ==
The yellow-breasted bunting is a small passerine, ranging from 14 to 16 cm (5.5 to 6.3 in) in length, and weighing 17 to 26 g (0.6 to 0.9 oz). For a bunting, it is large and rather stocky.

The breeding male has bright white underparts with black flank streaks, brown upperparts, black face and throat bar, and a pink lower mandible. The female has a heavily streaked grey-brown back, and less intensely yellow underparts. She has a whitish face with dark crown, eye and cheek stripes. The juvenile is similar, but the background colour of the underparts and face is buff.

== Distribution and habitat ==
The nominate subspecies S. a. aureolus breeds in boreal forests of Finland to Bering Sea migrating to Indochina. The subspecies S. a. ornatus breeds from the Amur River to Manchuria, the Kamchatka Peninsula and the Kuril Islands. It is migratory, wintering in south-east Asia and India. It is a rare but regular wanderer to western Europe. There are also ~4 records from the Aleutian Islands of Alaska and a 2017 record from Labrador, Canada. The species winters in large flocks in cultivated areas, rice fields and grasslands, preferring to roost in rice-fields.

In the first third of 2023, roosts of up to 6,378 birds were found in reedbeds at Kyon Ka Pyin-Tap Seik Conservation Area, in the Irrawaddy Delta, Myanmar, exceeding previous known maxima for the species in southern Asia.

== Breeding ==
The yellow-breasted bunting breeds in open scrubby areas that consist of dry water rice fields for foraging and reedbeds for roosting, often near water, and is present in Siberia. It lays four to six eggs in a nest on the ground. Its food consists of insects when feeding young, and otherwise seeds.

== Conservation ==
Populations have declined precipitously since the early 2000s, and the species is now considered to be critically endangered. The decline of the yellow-breasted bunting is likely to be caused by substantial trapping during migration and most specifically at winter sites. Birds are flushed then caught in mist-nets, to be sold for consumption as "sparrows" or "rice birds". Even though the actions have been restricted to a small area in southern China, it has become more widespread and popular to increasing wealth, and hunters now travel long distances to find sufficient birds.
