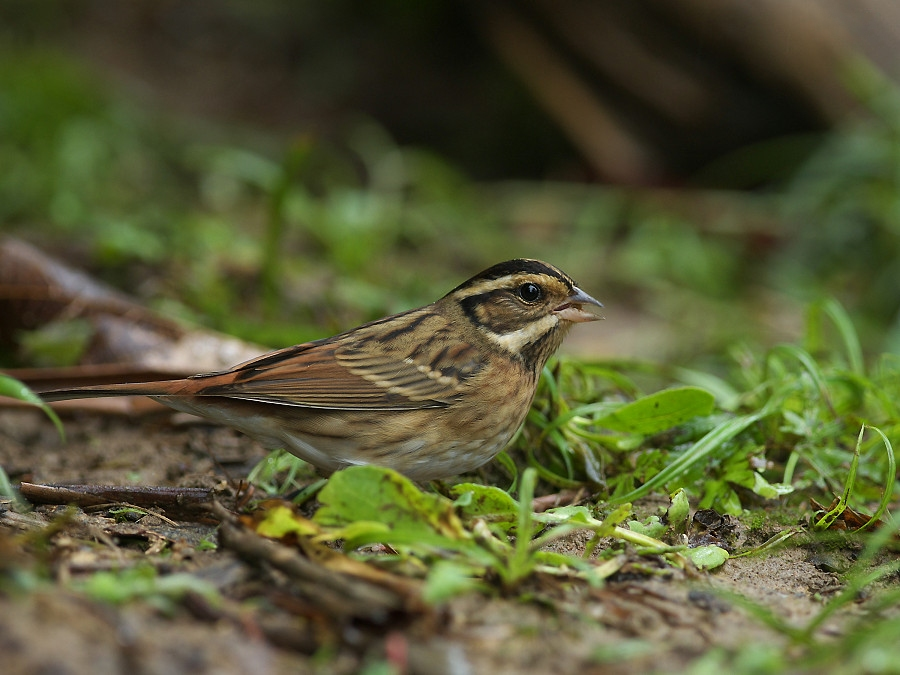

Conservation status
- Least Concern (IUCN 3.1)

Scientific classification
- Kingdom: Animalia
- Phylum: Chordata
- Class: Aves
- Order: Passeriformes
- Family: Emberizidae
- Genus: Schoeniclus
- Species: S. tristrami

Binomial name
- Schoeniclus tristrami (R. Swinhoe, 1870)

= Tristram's bunting =

Species of bird

Tristram's bunting (Schoeniclusa tristrami) is a bird in the family Emberizidae. The species was first described by Robert Swinhoe in 1870.

It breeds in eastern Manchuria and the Russian Far East and winters in central and southern China.

It is accidental in Japan, Korea, Laos, Myanmar, Russia, Mongolia, Taiwan, Thailand, Vietnam and north-eastern India. Its natural habitat is boreal forests.

Tristram's bunting was formerly placed in the genus Emberiza but in 2026 it was moved to the resurrected genus Schoeniclus based on the results of a 2021 molecular genetic study. Within the genus it is most closely related to the grey bunting (Schoeniclus variabilis).
