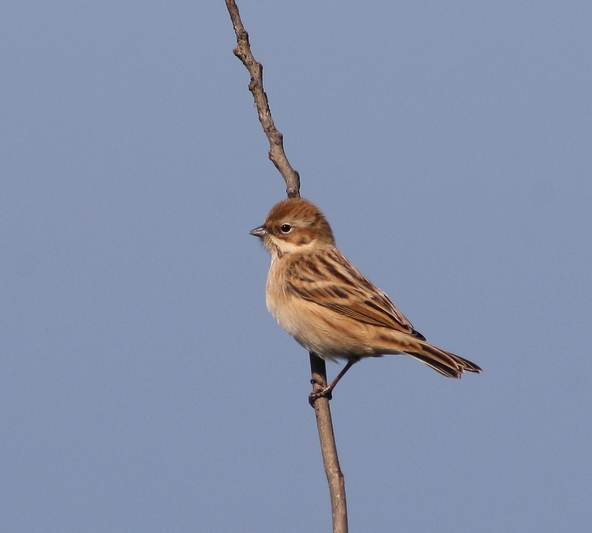

Conservation status
- Least Concern (IUCN 3.1)

Scientific classification
- Kingdom: Animalia
- Phylum: Chordata
- Class: Aves
- Order: Passeriformes
- Family: Emberizidae
- Genus: Schoeniclus
- Species: S. pallasi

Binomial name
- Schoeniclus pallasi (Cabanis, 1851)

Synonyms
- Cynchramus pallasi Cabanis, 1851; Schoeniclus pallasi (Cabanis, 1851)

= Pallas's reed bunting =

Species of bird

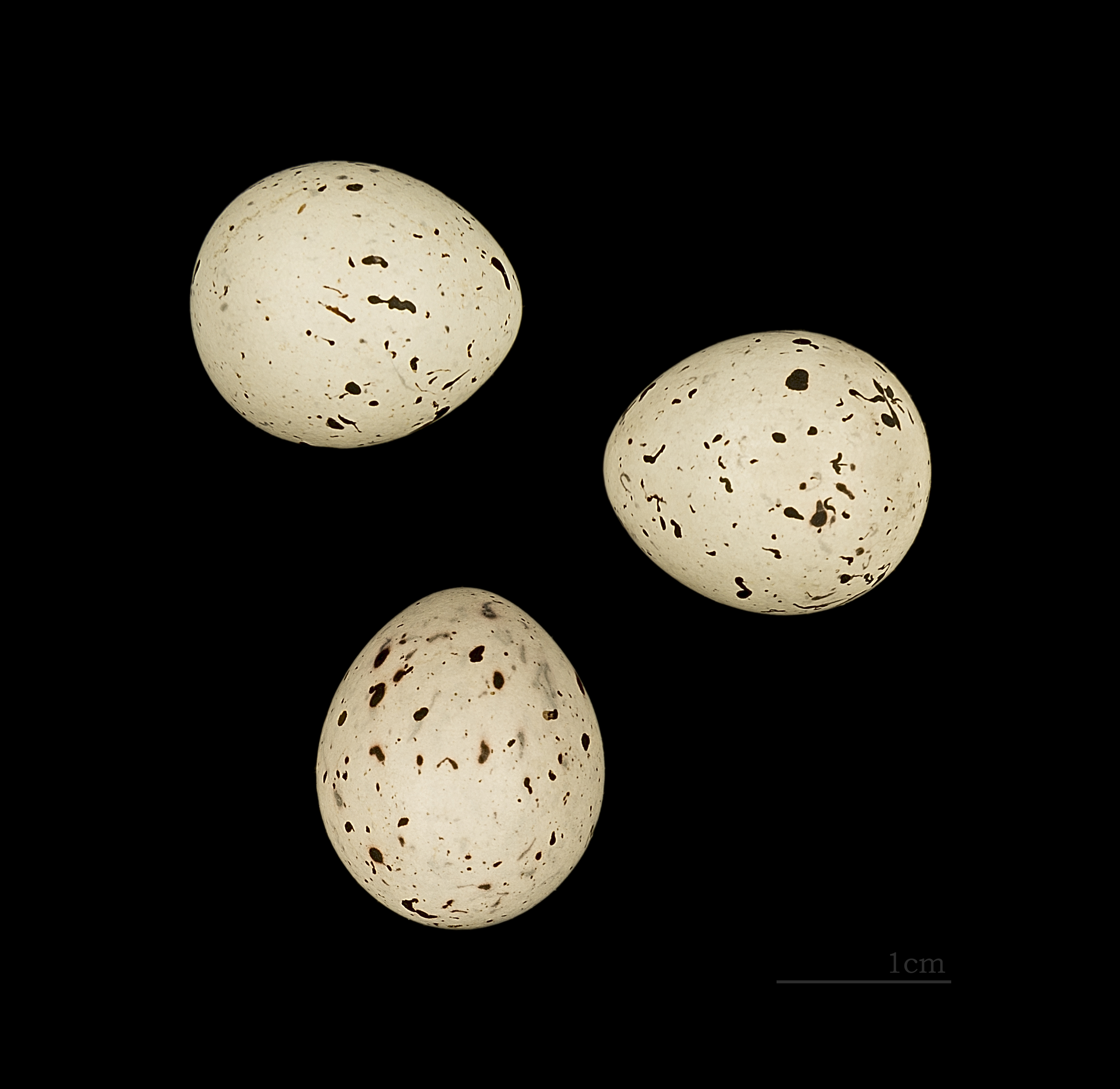
Emberiza pallas MHNT

Pallas's reed bunting (Schoeniclus pallasi), also known as Pallas's bunting, is a passerine bird in the Old World bunting family, Emberizidae.

== Taxonomy ==
The English name and the specific pallasii commemorate the German naturalist and explorer Peter Simon Pallas.

This species was formerly placed in the genus Emberiza. In 2026 it was moved to the resurrected genus Schoeniclus based on the results of a 2021 molecular genetic study. Within the genus Schoeniclus, Pallas's reed bunting is most closely related to the ochre-rumped bunting and the common reed bunting.

Three subspecies are recognised:

- S. p. minor (Middendorff, 1853) – breeds Transbaikalia eastward to Russian Far East and northeastern China (Heilongjiang); winters in eastern China
- S. p. polaris (Middendorff, 1853) – breeds northeastern European Russia eastward in Siberia (southward to basins of Angara, Lena, and Aldan rivers) to Chukchi Peninsula, Sea of Okhotsk coast, and northern Kamchatka Peninsula; winters in northeastern and eastern China, far southeastern Russia and Korea
- S. p. lydiae (Portenko, 1929) – breeds in southern Siberia and Mongolia, probably to adjacent northeastern China (northeastern Inner Mongolia); non-breeding probably in northern China

== Description ==
Pallas's reed bunting is a small passerine bird, similar to a small common reed bunting and possesses a small granivore-type bill. The male has a black head and throat, a white neck collar and underparts, and a heavily streaked grey back (the reed bunting has a browner back). The female is much duller, with a streaked brown head, and is less streaked below than the female reed bunting.

The song of the male is a repetitive sherp.

== Distribution and habitat ==
It breeds across northern and central Asia to Mongolia. It is a migrant species, wintering in southeast Asia. It is a very rare vagrant to western Europe, but has occurred as far west as Great Britain. It is common in tundra scrub by water, and also breeds in drier open areas such as open larch forest.

== Behaviour ==
Its natural diet consists of insects when feeding young, and otherwise seeds.

=== Breeding ===
Breeding occurs between June and August, earlier in the north of its range. The nest, typically made from grasses and sedges, is in a bush and lined with finer materials such as smaller grasses and hair. The bunting lays 3–5 cream-colored eggs, which show the hair-like markings characteristic of bunting eggs. The incubation period is 11 days.
