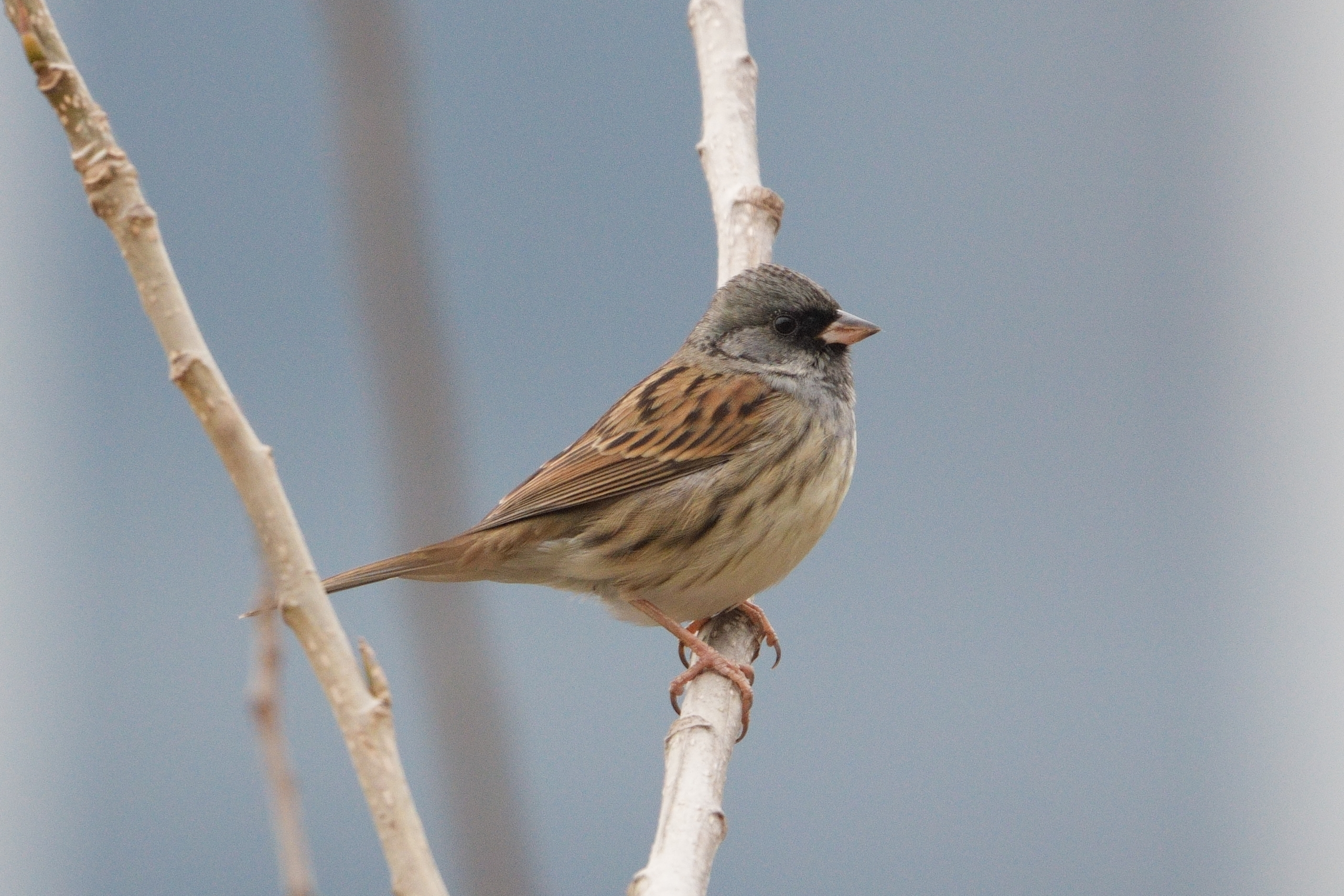
- In Hangzhou

Conservation status
- Least Concern (IUCN 3.1)

Scientific classification
- Kingdom: Animalia
- Phylum: Chordata
- Class: Aves
- Order: Passeriformes
- Family: Emberizidae
- Genus: Schoeniclus
- Species: S. spodocephalus

Binomial name
- Schoeniclus spodocephalus (Pallas, 1776)

= Black-faced bunting =

Species of bird

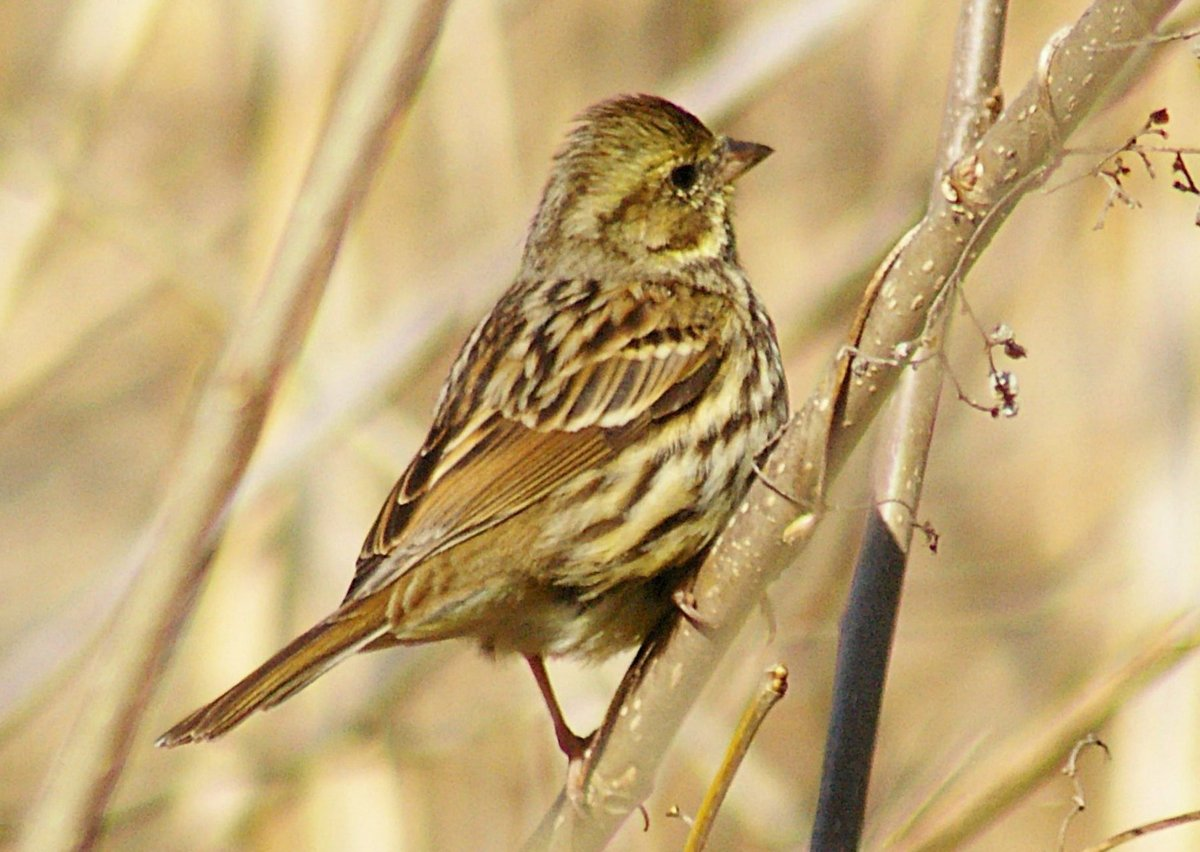
Female

The black-faced bunting (Schoeniclus spodocephalus) is a small passerine bird in the Old World bunting family Emberizidae. It breeds in eastern Russia and Mongolia and winters from central Nepal to northern Indochina.

== Taxonomy ==
The specific epithet spodocephala is from Ancient Greek spodos, "ashes", and kephalos, "headed".

This species was formerly placed in the genus Emberiza but in 2026 it was moved to the resurrected genus Schoeniclus based on the results of a 2021 molecular genetic study.

Two subspecies are recognised:

- S. s. spodocephalus (Pallas, 1776) – breeds south-central Russia and northern Mongolia eastward to Sea of Okhotsk and northern Sakhalin, and southward to northeastern China and Korea Peninsula; winters to southern and eastern China, Ryukyu Islands, and Taiwan
- S. s. sordidus (Blyth, 1845) – breeds Qinghai and Shaanxi southward to Yunnan and Guizhou (central China); winters central Nepal to northern Indochina

== Description ==
This bird's general appearance and terrestrial feeding habits give the impression of a dunnock with a bunting's bill. It is similar in size to a common reed bunting at about 16 cm long. The breeding male has a dark grey head with a mix of yellow green and black between the bill and eye. The upperparts are brown and heavily streaked with black, except on the rump. The rump is brown and the tail is also a dark brown. The underparts are yellowish white with some fine dark brown flank streaks. The stout bill is pink.

Females and young birds have a weaker head pattern, with olive-grey cheeks and a weak creamy white supercilium. The underparts are creamy yellow heavily streaked with dark brown.

The bird's call is like a tzii or tzee. It sound very "metallic" and it is a very short and not exactly a song at all. It nests on trees or on the ground and lays about four to five eggs.

== Distribution ==
It breeds in southern Siberia across to northern China. It is migratory, wintering in north-east India, southern China and northern south-east Asia. It is a very rare vagrant to western Europe.

The black-faced bunting breeds in dense undergrowth along streams and rivers in the taiga zone, and lays four or five eggs in a ground or tree nest. Its natural food consists of seeds, and when feeding young, insects. It winters close to water in agricultural or other open bushy habitats.
