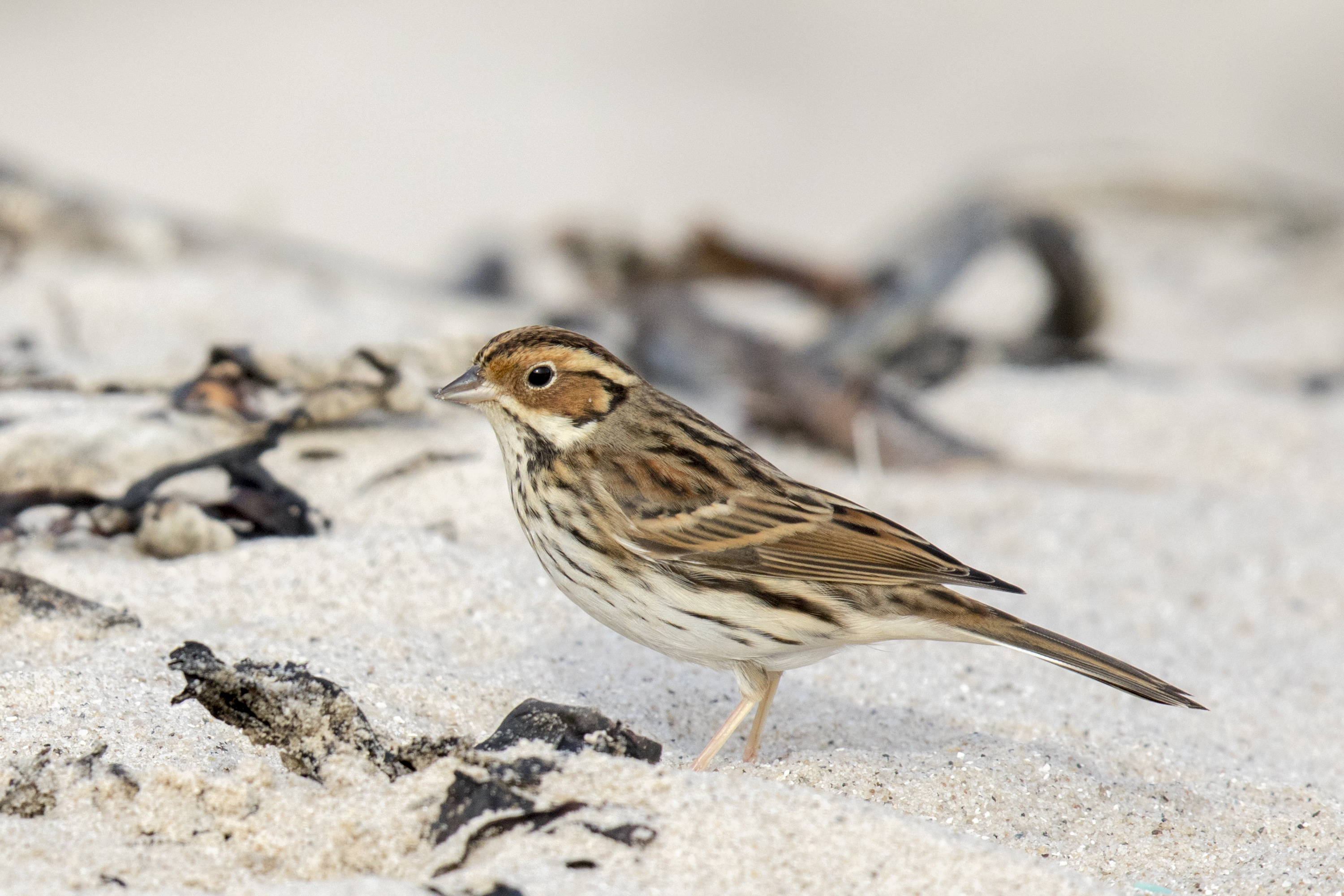
- On the island of Heligoland in the North Sea

Conservation status
- Least Concern (IUCN 3.1)

Scientific classification
- Kingdom: Animalia
- Phylum: Chordata
- Class: Aves
- Order: Passeriformes
- Family: Emberizidae
- Genus: Schoeniclus
- Species: S. pusillus

Binomial name
- Schoeniclus pusillus (Pallas, 1776)
- Range Breeding Non-breeding

= Little bunting =

Species of bird

The little bunting (Schoeniclus pusillus) is a small passerine bird belonging to the Old World bunting family Emberizidae.

== Taxonomy ==
First described by Peter Simon Pallas in 1776, the little bunting is a monotypic species, with no geographical variation across its extensive Palearctic range. The specific epithet pusillus is Latin for "very small".

This species was formerly placed in the genus Emberiza but in 2026 it was moved to the resurrected genus Schoeniclus based on the results of a 2021 molecular genetic study.

== Description ==
This is a small bunting, measuring only 12–14 cm (4.7–5.5 in) in length. It has white underparts with dark streaking on the breast and sides. With its chestnut face and white malar stripe, it resembles a small female reed bunting, but has black crown stripes, a white eye-ring, and a fine dark border to the rear of its chestnut cheeks. The sexes are similar.

The call is a distinctive zik, and the song is a rolling siroo-sir-sir-siroo.

== Breeding ==
The little bunting breeds across the taiga of the far north-east of Europe and northern Eurosiberia to the Russian Far East. It is migratory, wintering in the subtropics in northern India, southern China and the northern parts of south-east Asia. The birds remain in their winter quarters for quite long; specimens were taken in Yunnan in late March. It is a rare vagrant to western Europe. This species is adaptable; in the mountains of Bhutan for example, where small numbers winter, it is typically found in an agricultural habitat, mostly between 1,000 and 2,000 metres (3,280 and 6,560 ft) ASL.

It breeds in open coniferous woodland, often with some birch or willow. Four to six eggs are laid in a tree nest. Its natural food consists of seeds, or when feeding young, insects.

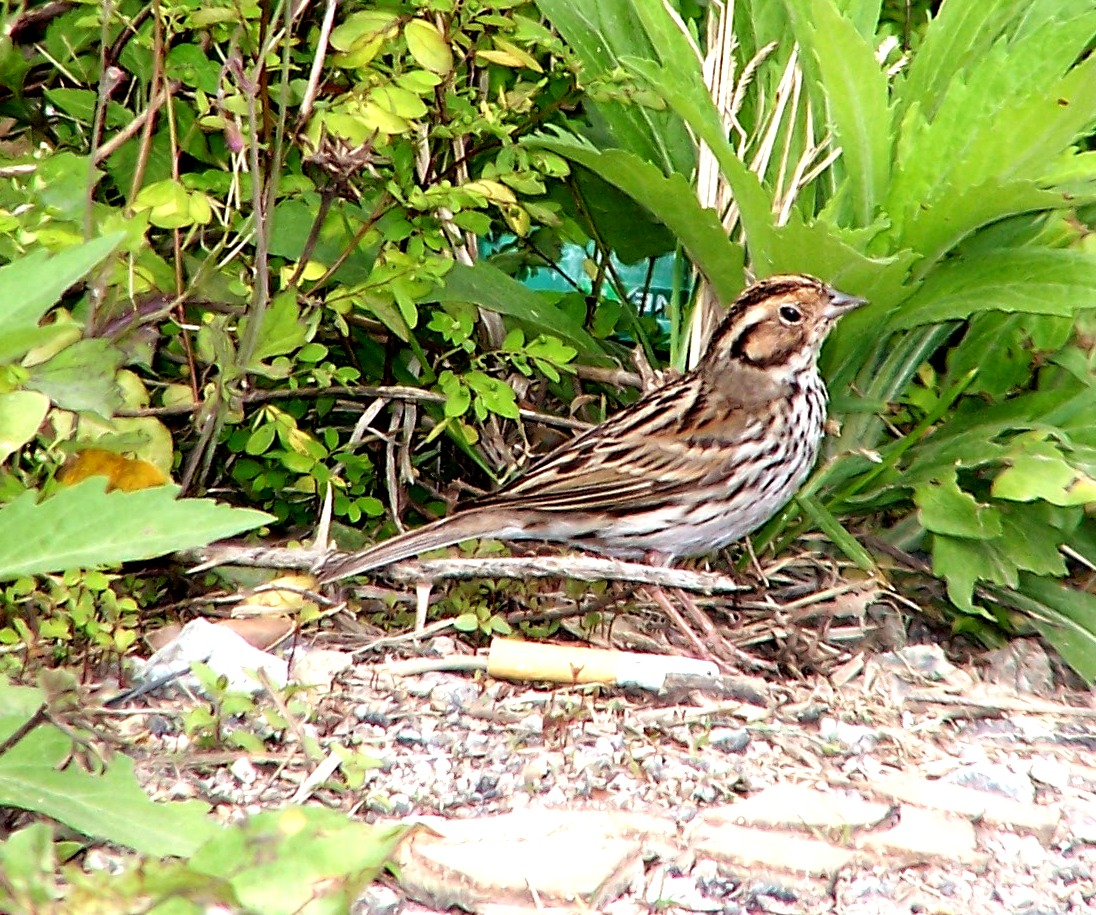
Little bunting.

A common and widely-ranging species, it is not considered threatened on the IUCN Red List.
