= List of birds of Oregon =

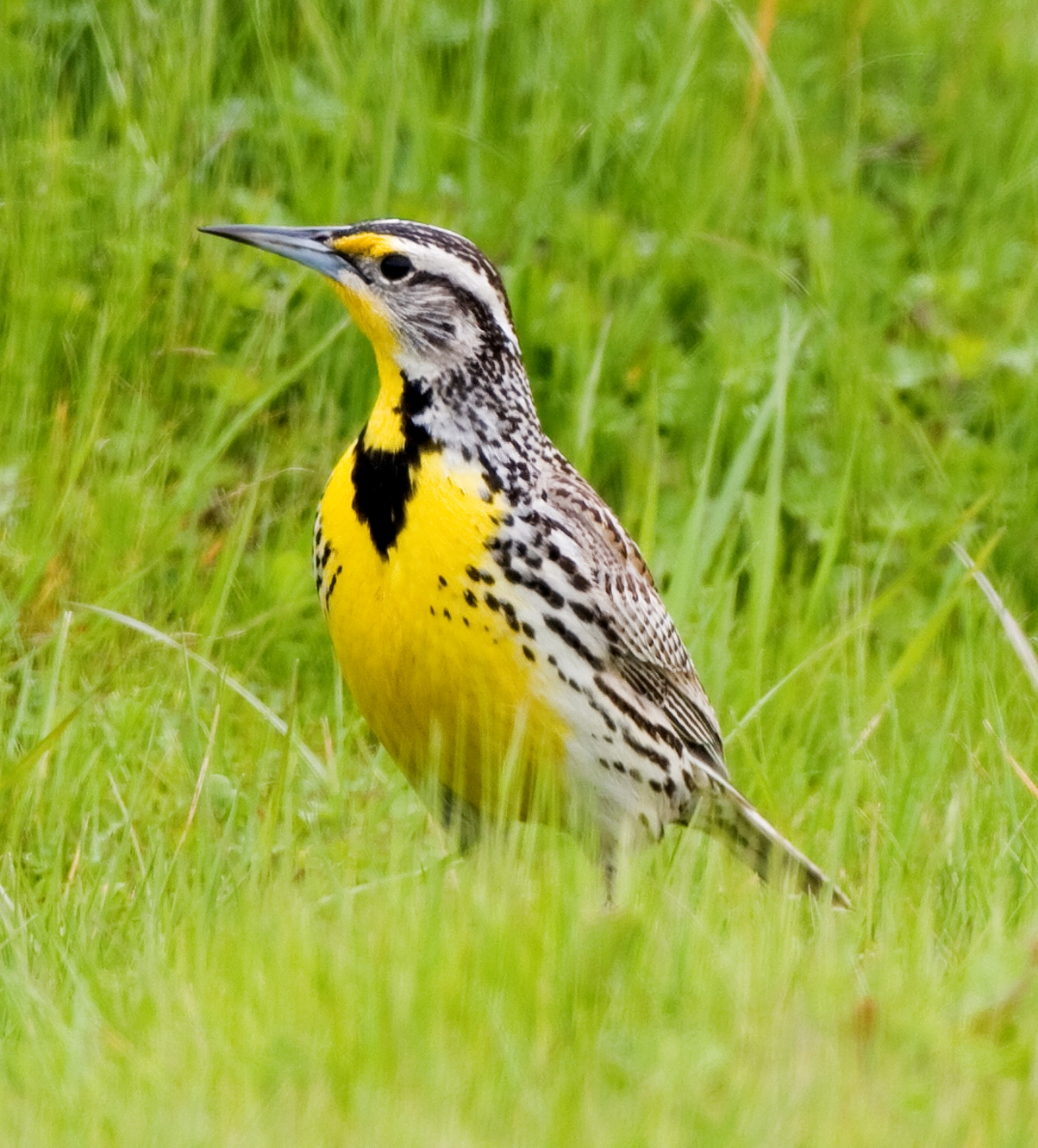
The western meadowlark is Oregon's state bird.

This list of Oregon birds lists wild bird species found in the U.S. state of Oregon and accepted by the Oregon Bird Records Committee (OBRC). As of August 2022, there are 547 species on the list. Of them, 164 are on the review list (see below). Nine species were introduced to Oregon or elsewhere in North America; one of them and two others have been extirpated from the state.

Bird counts often change depending on factors such as the number and training of the observers, as well as opinions about what constitutes an officially recognized subspecies. Though northern climes typically do not support as many species as southerly locations, Oregon is fifth in bird species diversity in the United States, behind Florida, New Mexico, Texas and California. This amount of diversity is attributable to Oregon's numerous distinctive ecoregions and relatively mild winter weather, which make it an important wintering ground for migratory bird species, especially waterfowl, on the Pacific Flyway.

Another result of the state's varying ecology is the 120 Important Bird Areas, such as the Jackson Bottom Wetlands Preserve, that are recognized as important conservation sites for birds. Many of these dedicated wildlife refuges have become meccas for birding enthusiasts, and Oregon has participated in formally organized birding activities such as the Christmas Bird Count since the early 1900s. Other areas are closed to human access but are very popular with birds, such as Oregon Islands National Wildlife Refuge which spans some 250 miles (400 km) of the Oregon Coast.

As an important U.S. region of bird diversity, Oregon has faced some serious challenges in protecting endangered and threatened avian species. In addition to high profile, threatened species such as the northern spotted owl and snowy plover, even many common species—including Oregon's state bird, the western meadowlark—have declined considerably due to hunting, habitat loss and other factors.

This list is presented in the taxonomic sequence of the Check-list of North and Middle American Birds, 7th edition through the 62nd Supplement, published by the American Ornithological Society (AOS). Common and scientific names are also those of the Check-list, except that the common names of families are from the Clements taxonomy because the AOS list does not include them.

Unless otherwise noted, all species listed below are considered to occur regularly in Oregon as permanent residents, summer or winter visitors, or migrants. These tags are used to annotate some species:

- (R) Review list - birds that if seen require more comprehensive documentation than regularly seen species.
- (P) Provisional - "A review species, sight record only, no video or audio verification" per the OBRC
- (I) Introduced - a species established as a result of human action

== Ducks, geese, and waterfowl ==
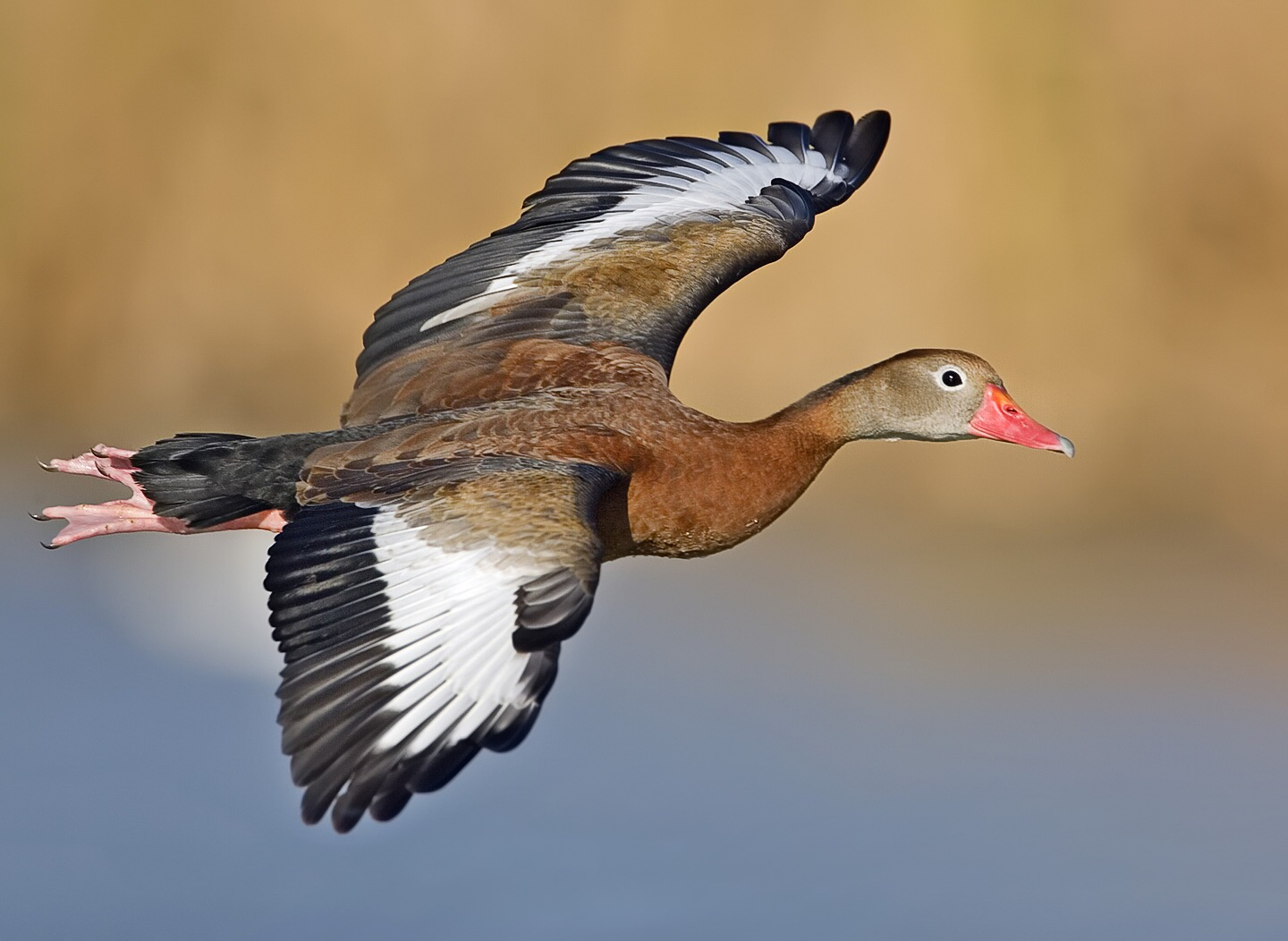
Black-bellied whistling-duck

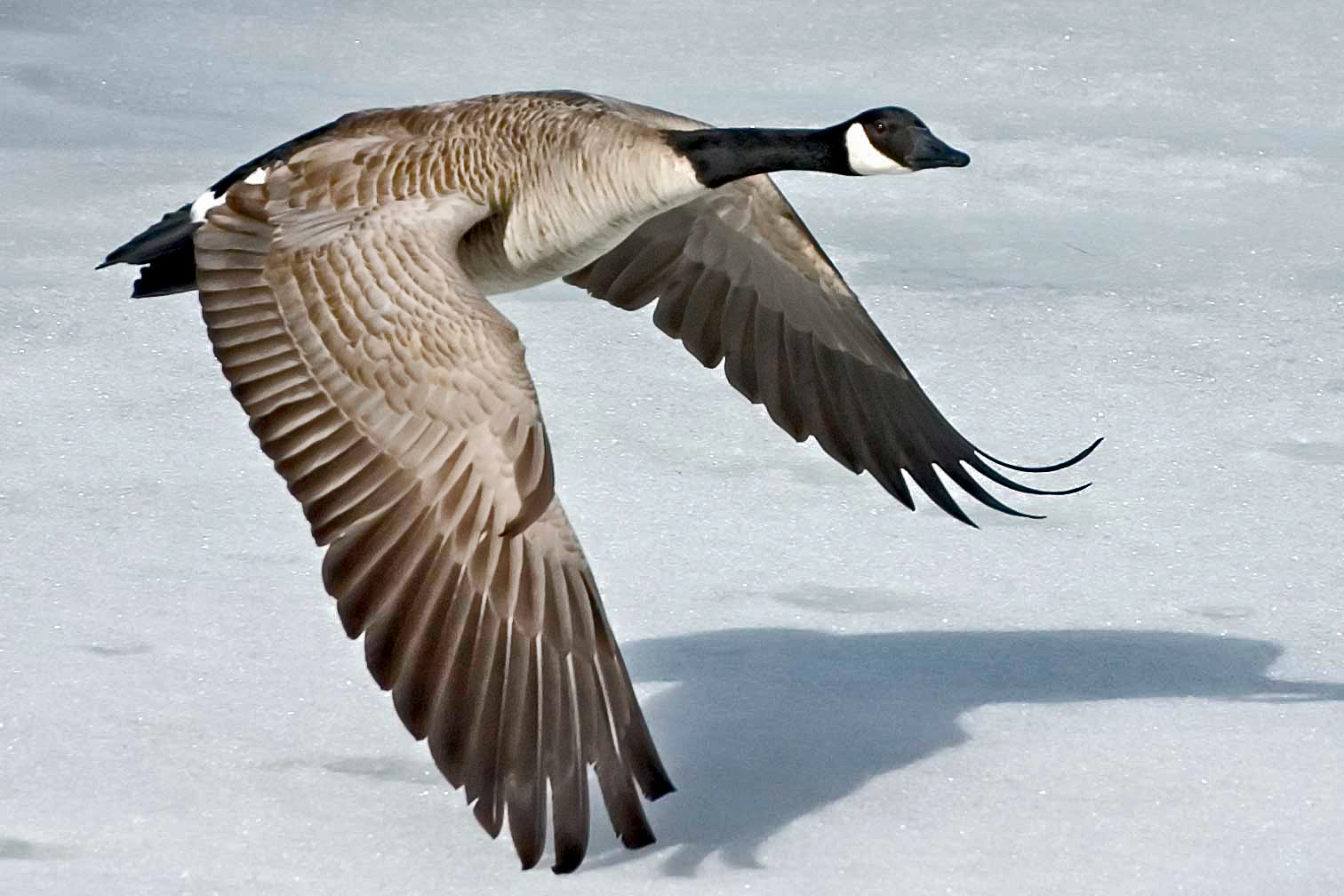
Canada goose

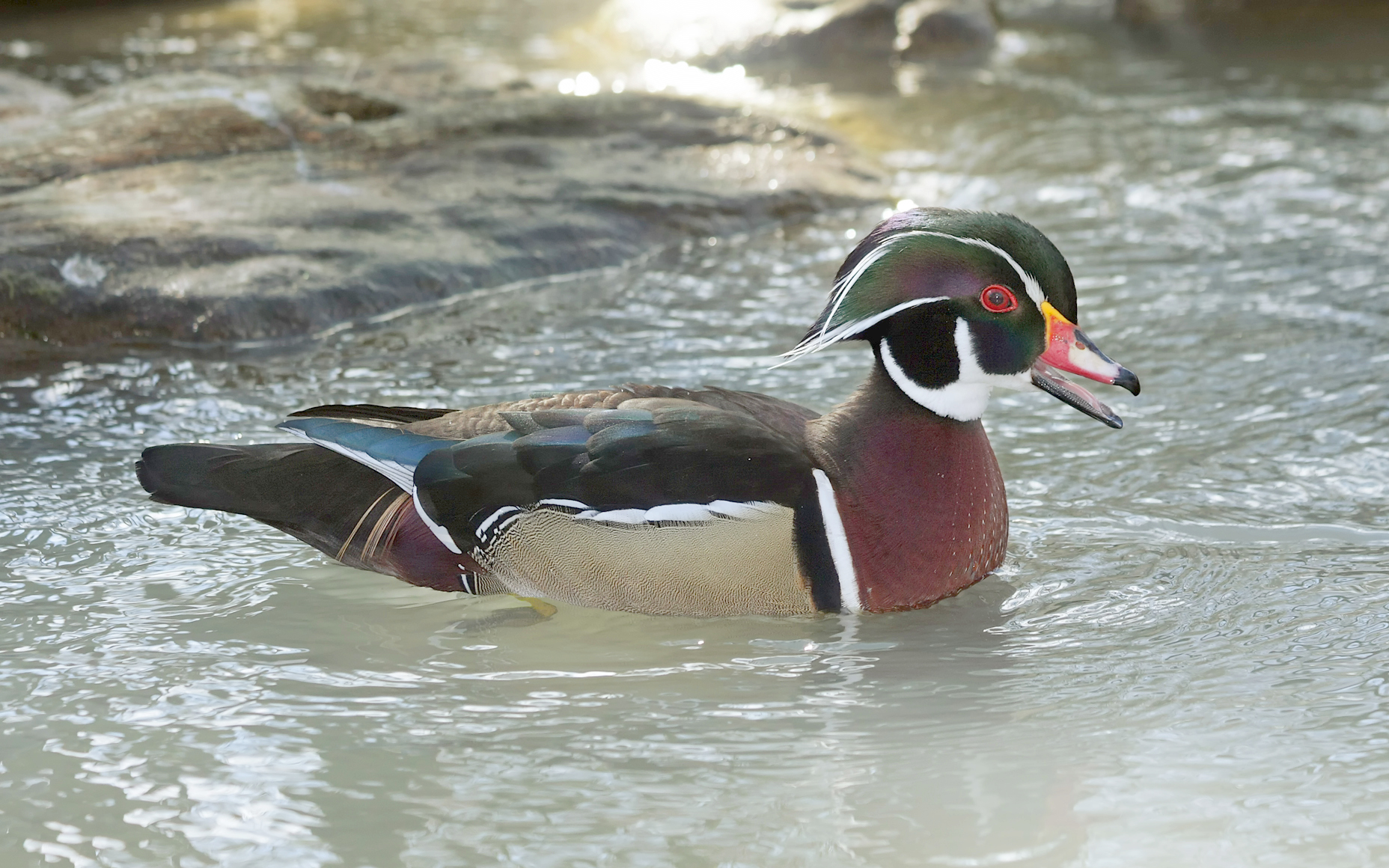
Wood duck

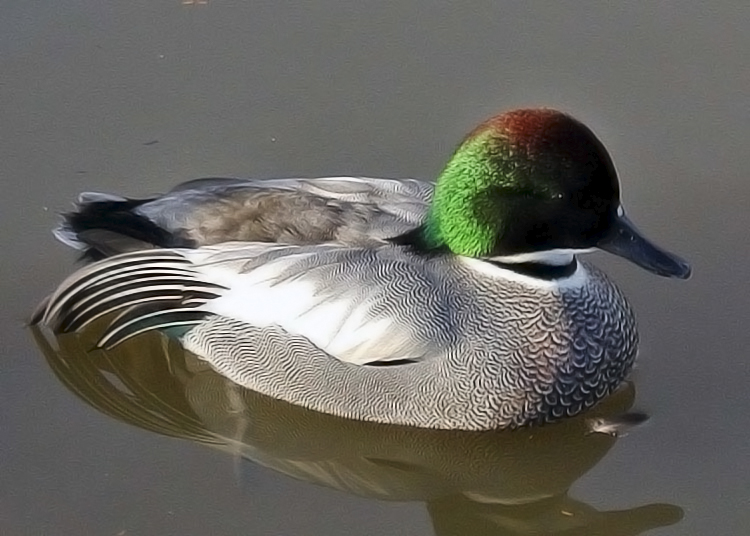
Falcated duck

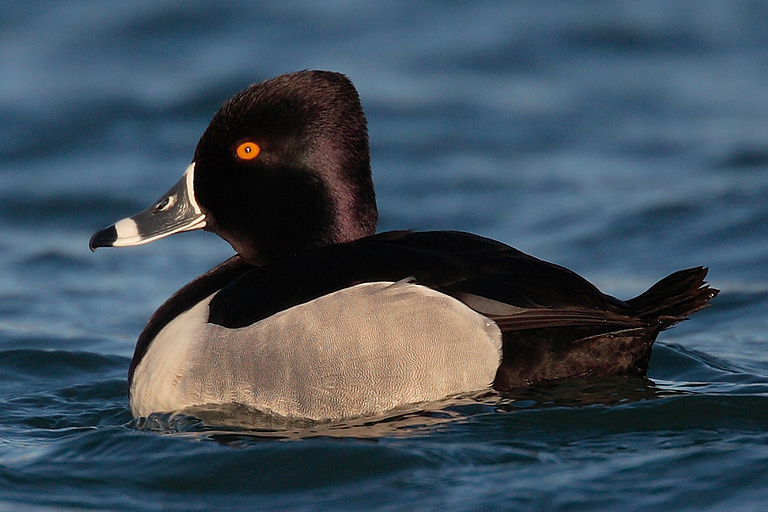
Ring-necked duck

Order: Anseriformes Family: Anatidae

The family Anatidae includes the ducks and most duck-like waterfowl, such as geese and swans. These birds are adapted to an aquatic existence with webbed feet, bills which are flattened to a greater or lesser extent, and feathers that are excellent at shedding water due to special oils.

- Black-bellied whistling-duck, Dendrocygna autumnalis (R)
- Fulvous whistling-duck, Dendrocygna bicolor (R)
- Emperor goose, Anser canagica
- Snow goose, Anser caerulescens
- Ross's goose, Anser rossii
- Greater white-fronted goose, Anser albifrons
- Tundra bean-goose, Anser serrirostris (R)
- Brant, Branta bernicla
- Cackling goose, Branta hutchinsii
- Canada goose, Branta canadensis
- Trumpeter swan, Cygnus buccinator
- Tundra swan, Cygnus columbianus
- Whooper swan, Cygnus cygnus (R)
- Wood duck, Aix sponsa
- Baikal teal, Sibirionetta formosa (R)
- Garganey, Sibirionetta querquedula (R)
- Blue-winged teal, Spatula discors
- Cinnamon teal, Spatula cyanoptera
- Northern shoveler, Spatula clypeata
- Gadwall, Mareca strepera
- Falcated duck, Mareca falcata (R)
- Eurasian wigeon, Mareca penelope
- American wigeon, Mareca americana
- American black duck, Anas rubripes (R)
- Mallard, Anas platyrhynchos
- Northern pintail, Anas acuta
- Green-winged teal, Anas crecca
- Canvasback, Aythya valisineria
- Redhead, Aythya americana
- Ring-necked duck, Aythya collaris
- Tufted duck, Aythya fuligula
- Greater scaup, Aythya marila
- Lesser scaup, Aythya affinis
- Steller's eider, Polysticta stelleri (R)
- King eider, Somateria spectabilis (R)
- Common eider, Somateria mollissima (R)
- Harlequin duck, Histrionicus histrionicus
- Surf scoter, Melanitta perspicillata
- White-winged scoter, Melanitta deglandi
- Common scoter, Melanitta nigra (R)
- Black scoter, Melanitta americana
- Long-tailed duck, Clangula hyemalis
- Bufflehead, Bucephala albeola
- Common goldeneye, Bucephala clangula
- Barrow's goldeneye, Bucephala islandica
- Smew, Mergellus albellus (R)
- Hooded merganser, Lophodytes cucullatus
- Common merganser, Mergus merganser
- Red-breasted merganser, Mergus serrator
- Ruddy duck, Oxyura jamaicensis

== New World quail ==
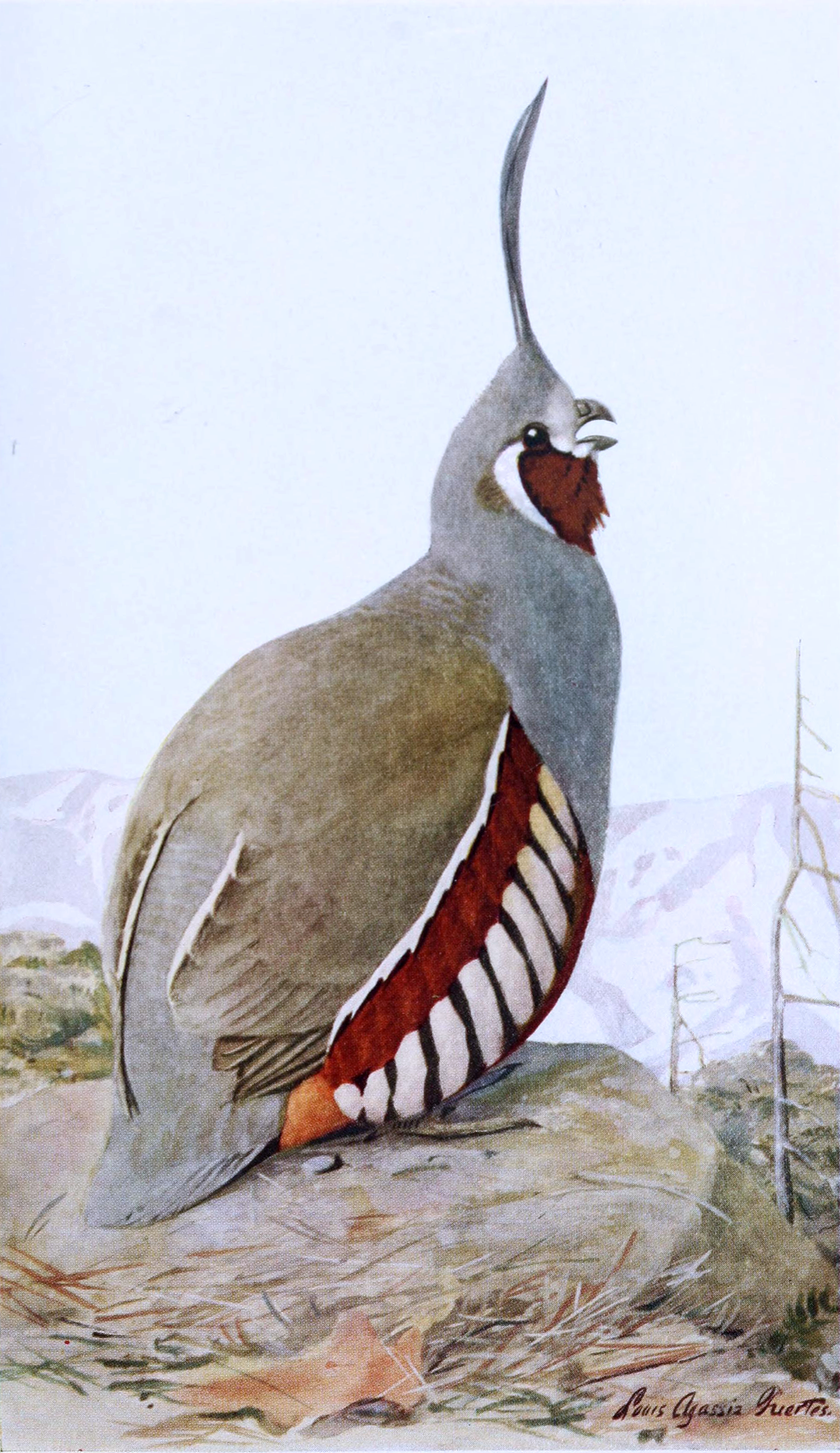
Mountain quail

Order: Galliformes Family: Odontophoridae

The New World quails are small, plump terrestrial birds only distantly related to the quails of the Old World, but named for their similar appearance and habits.

- Mountain quail, Oreortyx pictus
- Northern bobwhite, Colinus virginianus (I)(extirpated)
- California quail, Callipepla californica

== Pheasants, grouse, and allies ==
Order: Galliformes Family: Phasianidae

Phasianidae consists of the pheasants and their allies, including partridges, grouse, turkeys, and Old World quail. These are terrestrial species, variable in size but generally plump with broad relatively short wings. Many species are gamebirds or have been domesticated as a food source for humans.

- Wild turkey, Meleagris gallopavo (I)
- Ruffed grouse, Bonasa umbellus
- Greater sage-grouse, Centrocercus urophasianus
- Spruce grouse, Canachites canadensis
- Dusky grouse, Dendragapus obscurus
- Sooty grouse, Dendragapus fuliginosus
- Sharp-tailed grouse, Tympanuchus phasianellus (R)(extirpated)
- Chukar, Alectoris chukar (I)
- Gray partridge, Perdix perdix (I)
- Ring-necked pheasant, Phasianus colchicus (I)

== Grebes ==
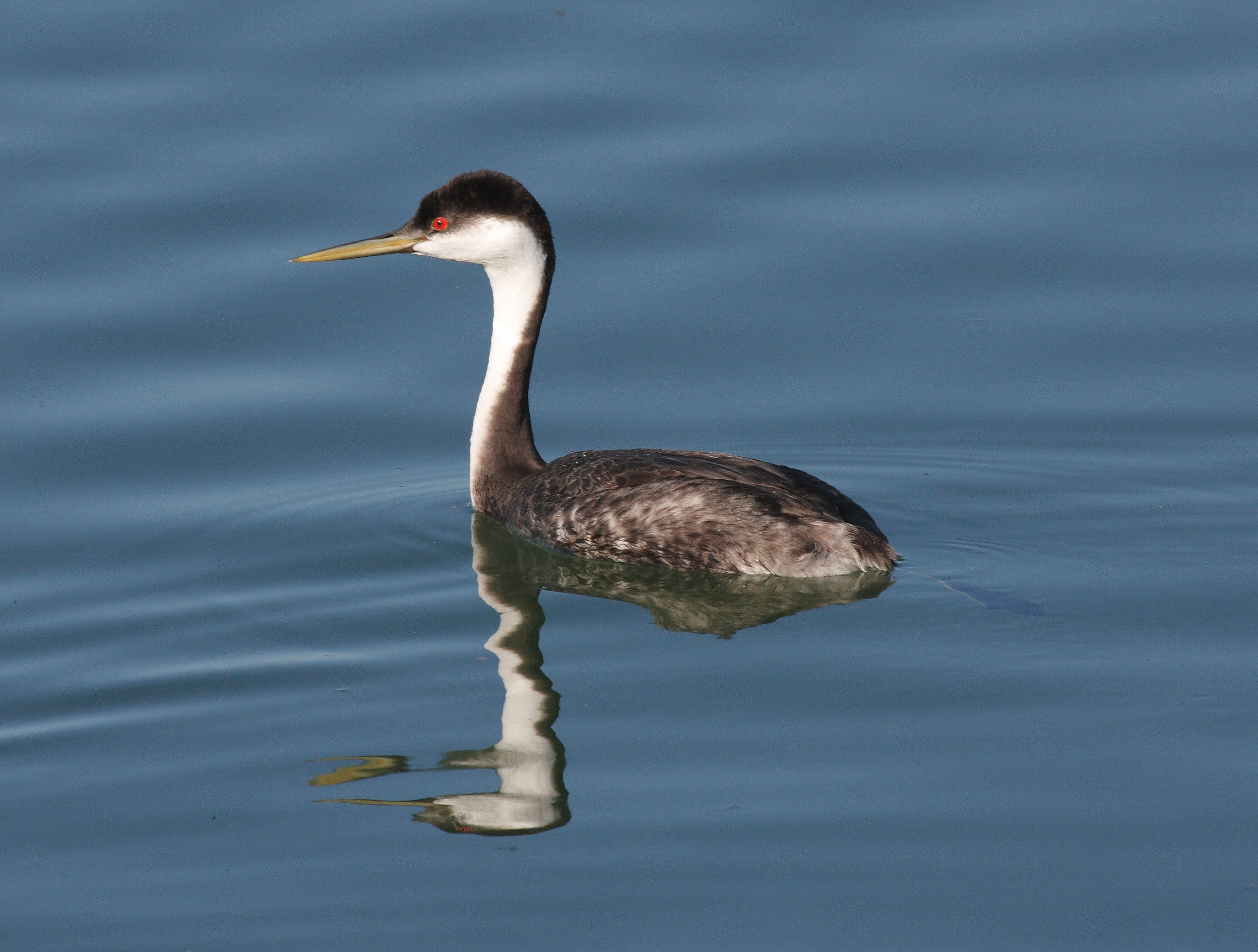
Western grebe

Order: Podicipediformes Family: Podicipedidae

Grebes are small to medium-large freshwater diving birds. They have lobed toes and are excellent swimmers and divers. However, they have their feet placed far back on the body, making them quite ungainly on land.

- Pied-billed grebe, Podilymbus podiceps
- Horned grebe, Podiceps auritus
- Red-necked grebe, Podiceps grisegena
- Eared grebe, Podiceps nigricollis
- Western grebe, Aechmophorus occidentalis
- Clark's grebe, Aechmophorus clarkii

== Pigeons and doves ==
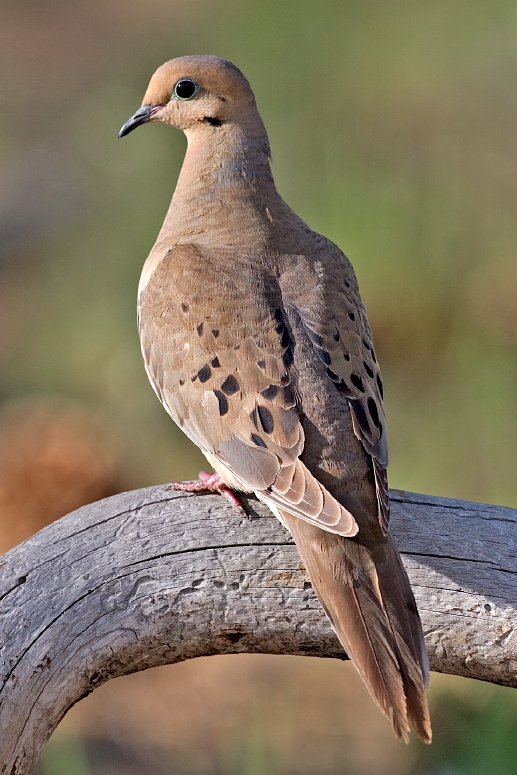
Mourning dove

Order: Columbiformes Family: Columbidae

Pigeons and doves are stout-bodied birds with short necks and short slender bills with a fleshy cere.

- Rock pigeon, Columba livia (I)
- Band-tailed pigeon, Patagioenas fasciata
- Eurasian collared-dove, Streptopelia decaocto (I)
- Common ground dove, Columbina passerina (R)
- White-winged dove, Zenaida asiatica
- Mourning dove, Zenaida macroura

== Cuckoos ==
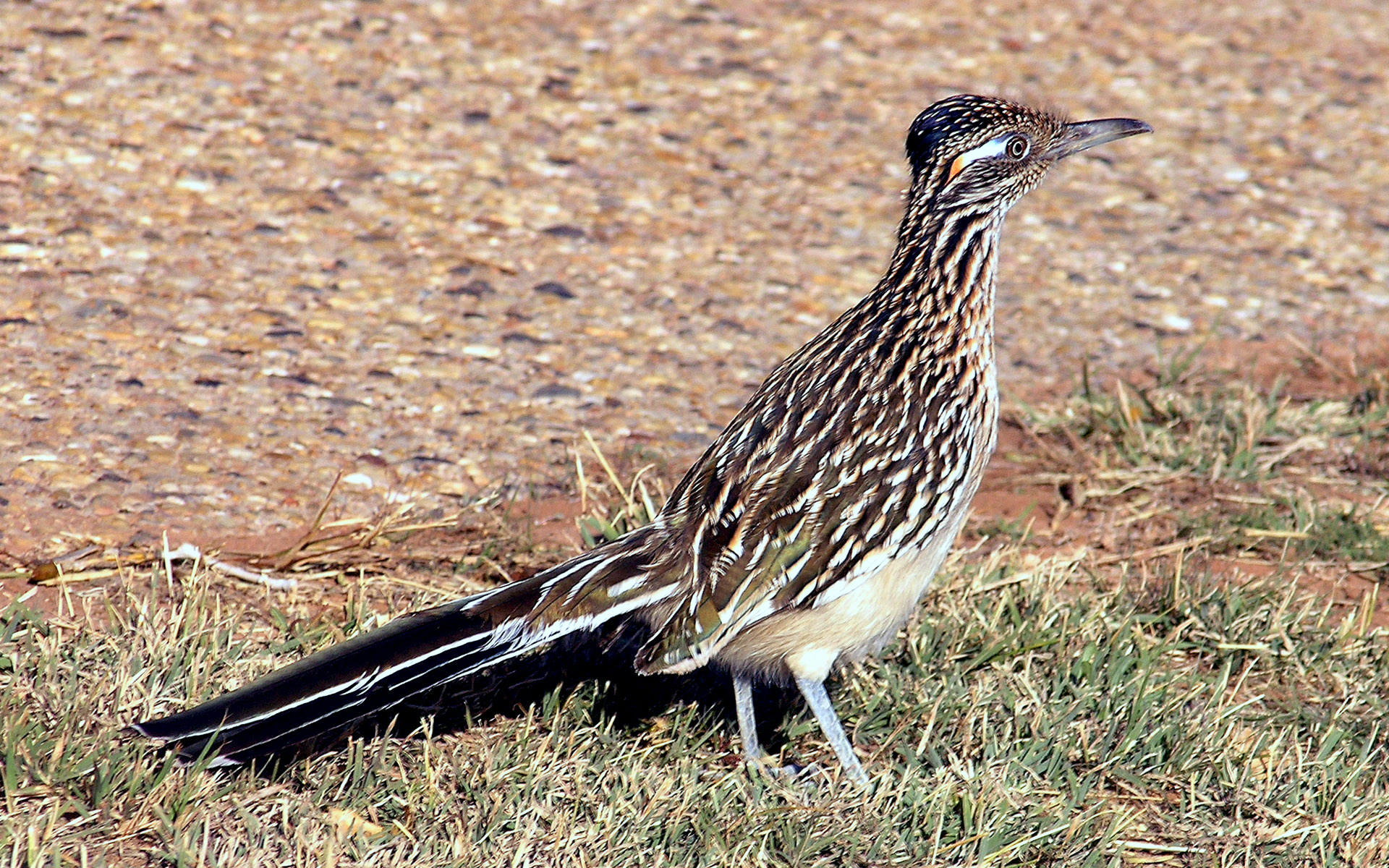
Greater roadrunner

Order: Cuculiformes Family: Cuculidae

The family Cuculidae includes cuckoos, roadrunners, and anis. These birds are of variable size with slender bodies, long tails, and strong legs. The Old World cuckoos are brood parasites.

- Greater roadrunner, Geococcyx californianus (R) (P)
- Yellow-billed cuckoo, Coccyzus americanus (R)

== Nightjars and allies ==
Order: Caprimulgiformes Family: Caprimulgidae

Nightjars are medium-sized nocturnal birds that usually nest on the ground. They have long wings, short legs, and very short bills. Most have small feet, of little use for walking, and long pointed wings. Their soft plumage is cryptically colored to resemble bark or leaves.

- Lesser nighthawk, Chordeiles acutipennis (R)
- Common nighthawk, Chordeiles minor
- Common poorwill, Phalaenoptilus nuttallii
- Eastern whip-poor-will, Antrostomus vociferus (R)

== Swifts ==
Order: Apodiformes Family: Apodidae

The swifts are small birds which spend the majority of their lives flying. These birds have very short legs and never settle voluntarily on the ground, perching instead only on vertical surfaces. Many swifts have long swept-back wings which resemble a crescent or boomerang.

- Black swift, Cypseloides niger
- Chimney swift, Chaetura pelagica (R)
- Vaux's swift, Chaetura vauxi
- White-throated swift, Aeronautes saxatalis

== Hummingbirds ==
Order: Apodiformes Family: Trochilidae

Hummingbirds are small birds capable of hovering in mid-air due to the rapid flapping of their wings. They are the only birds that can fly backwards.

- Ruby-throated hummingbird, Archilochus colubris (R)
- Black-chinned hummingbird, Archilochus alexandri
- Anna's hummingbird, Calypte anna
- Costa's hummingbird, Calypte costae
- Calliope hummingbird, Selasphorus calliope
- Rufous hummingbird, Selasphorus rufus
- Allen's hummingbird, Selasphorus sasin
- Broad-tailed hummingbird, Selasphorus platycercus
- Broad-billed hummingbird, Cynanthus latirostris (R)

== Rails, gallinules, and coots ==
Order: Gruiformes Family: Rallidae

Rallidae is a large family of small to medium-sized birds which includes the rails, crakes, coots, and gallinules. The most typical family members occupy dense vegetation in damp environments near lakes, swamps, or rivers. In general they are shy and secretive birds, making them difficult to observe. Most species have strong legs and long toes which are well adapted to soft uneven surfaces. They tend to have short, rounded wings and to be weak fliers.

- Virginia rail, Rallus limicola
- Sora, Porzana carolina
- Common gallinule, Gallinula galeata (R)
- American coot, Fulica americana
- Yellow rail, Coturnicops noveboracensis

== Cranes ==
Order: Gruiformes Family: Gruidae

Cranes are large, long-legged, long-necked birds. Unlike the similar-looking but unrelated herons, cranes fly with necks outstretched, not pulled back. Most have elaborate and noisy courting displays or "dances".

- Sandhill crane, Antigone canadensis
- Common crane, Grus grus (R)

== Stilts and avocets ==
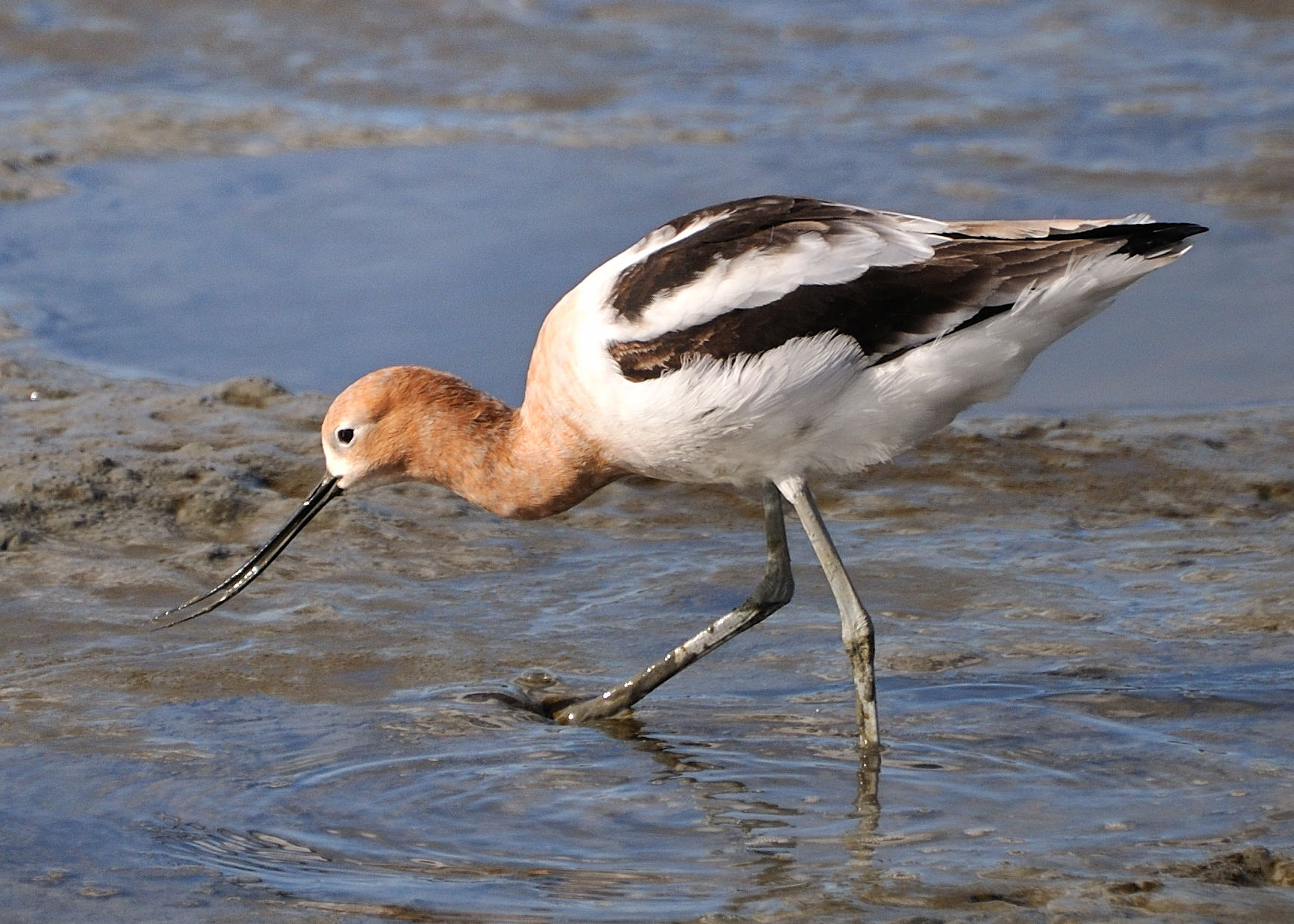
American avocet

Order: Charadriiformes Family: Recurvirostridae

Recurvirostridae is a family of large wading birds which includes the avocets and stilts. The avocets have long legs and long up-curved bills. The stilts have extremely long legs and long, thin, straight bills.

- Black-necked stilt, Himantopus mexicanus
- American avocet, Recurvirostra americana

== Oystercatchers ==
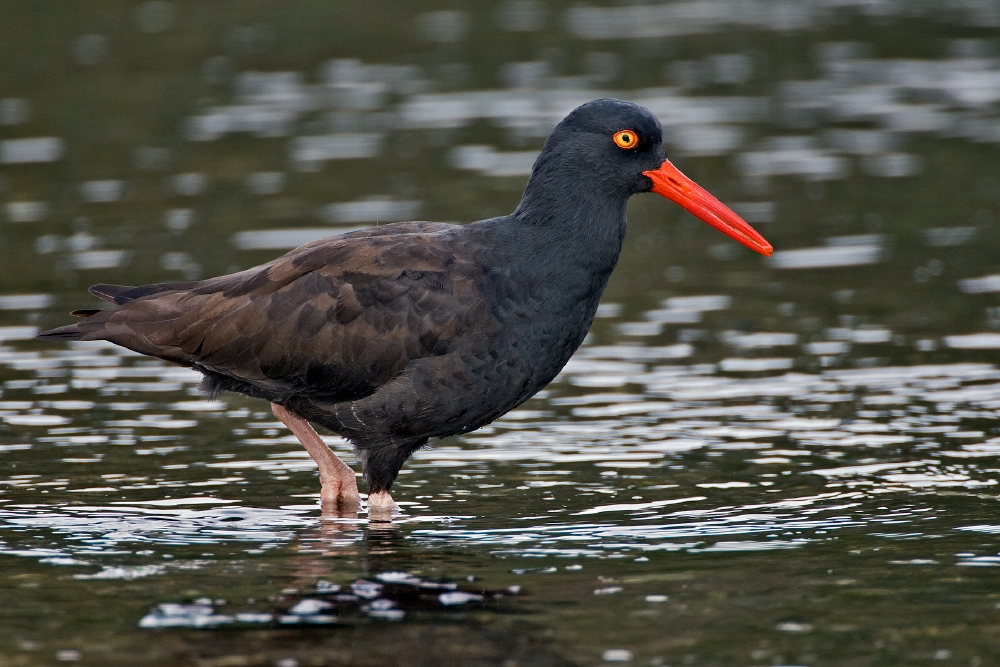
Black oystercatcher

Order: Charadriiformes Family: Haematopodidae

The oystercatchers are large, obvious, and noisy plover-like birds, with strong bills used for smashing or prising open molluscs.

- Black oystercatcher, Haematopus bachmani

== Plovers and lapwings ==
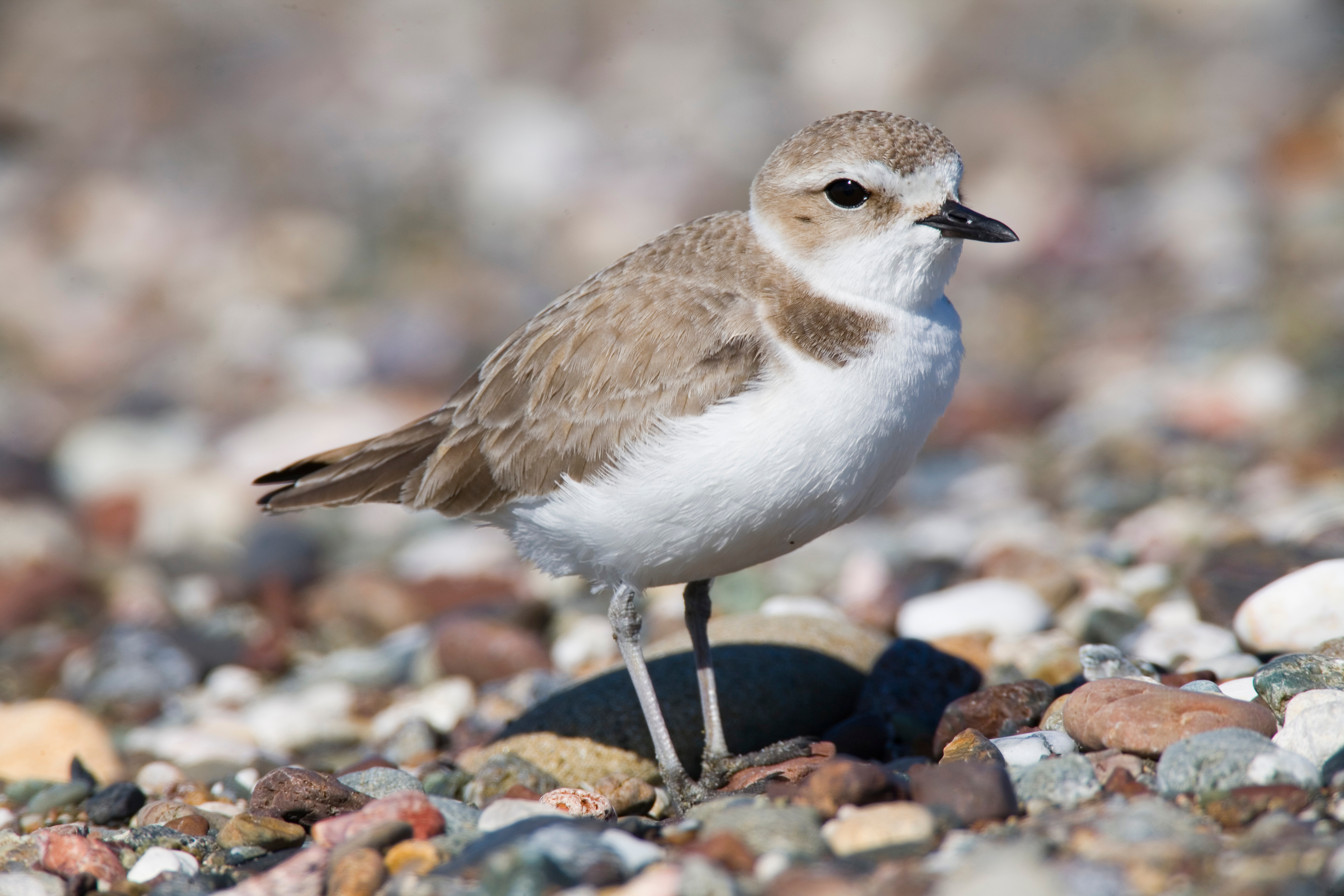
Snowy plover

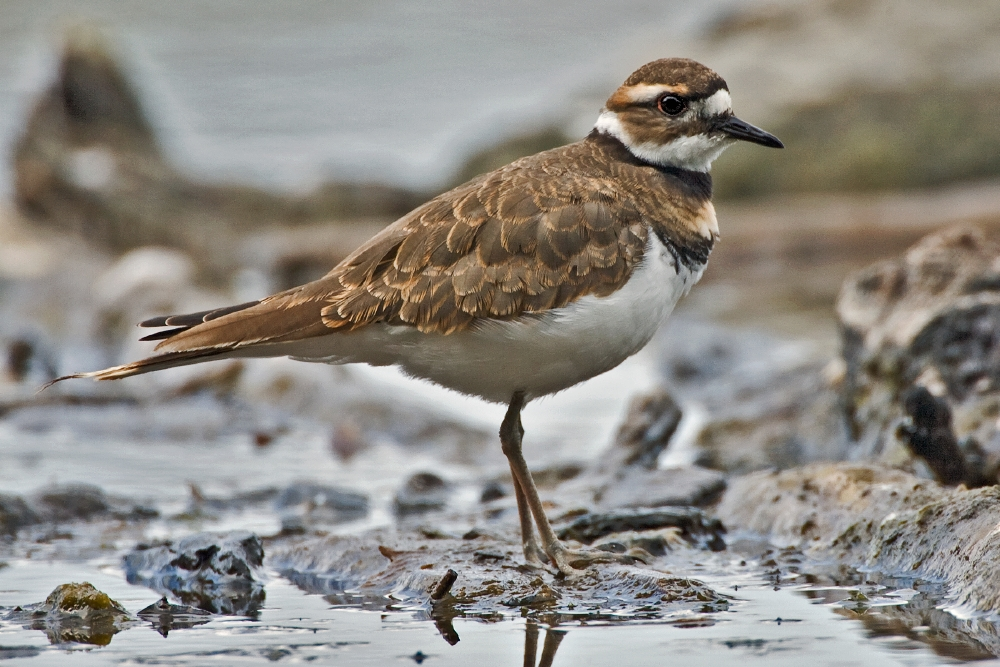
Killdeer

Order: Charadriiformes Family: Charadriidae

The family Charadriidae includes the plovers, dotterels, and lapwings. They are small to medium-sized birds with compact bodies, short thick necks, and long, usually pointed, wings. They are found in open country worldwide, mostly in habitats near water.

- Black-bellied plover, Pluvialis squatarola
- American golden-plover, Pluvialis dominica
- Pacific golden-plover, Pluvialis fulva
- Eurasian dotterel, Charadrius morinellus (R)
- Killdeer, Charadrius vociferus
- Semipalmated plover, Charadrius semipalmatus
- Piping plover, Charadrius melodus (R) (P)
- Lesser sand-plover, Charadrius mongolus (R)
- Wilson's plover, Charadrius wilsonia (R)
- Snowy plover, Charadrius nivosus
- Mountain plover, Charadrius montanus (R)

== Sandpipers and allies ==
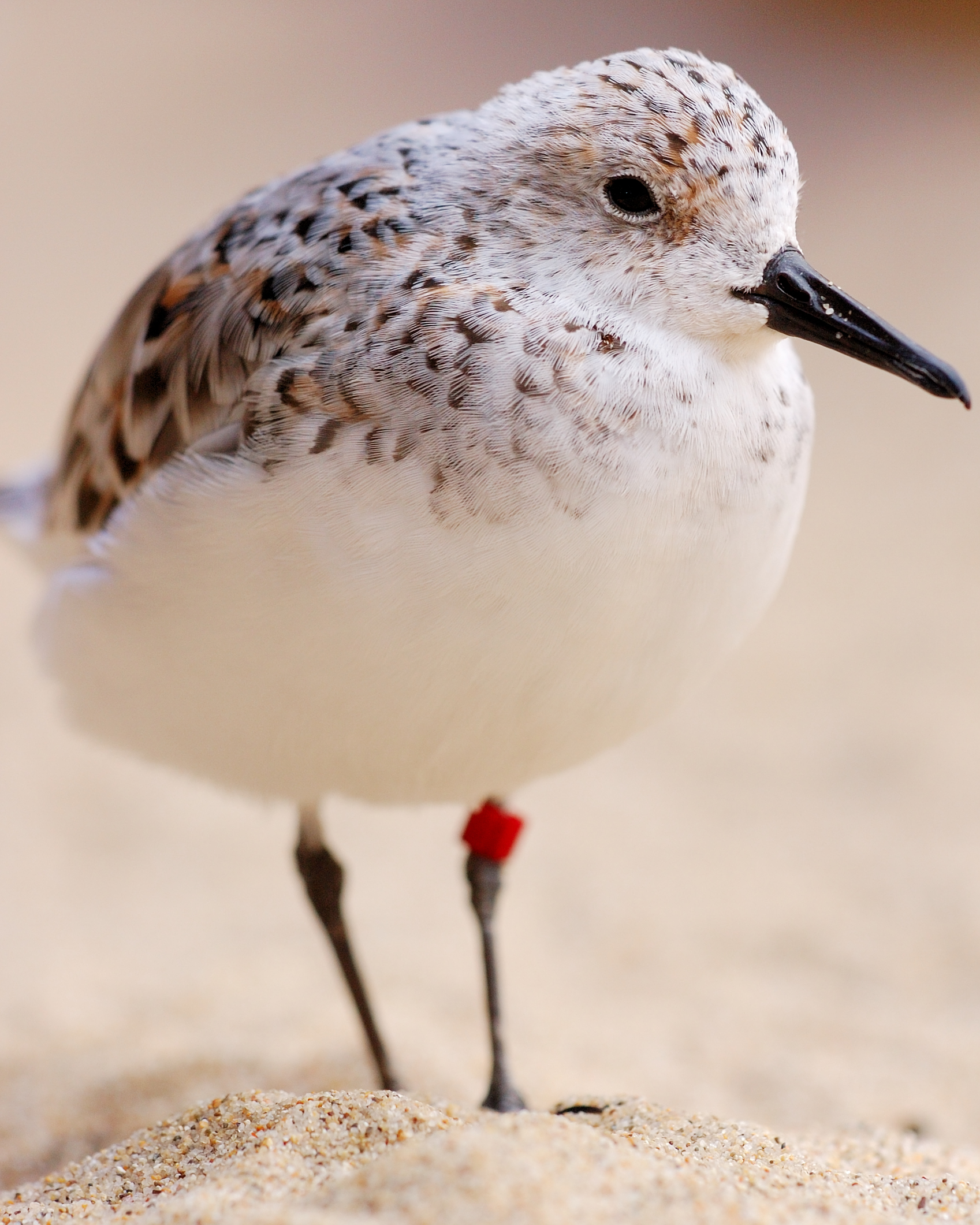
Sanderling

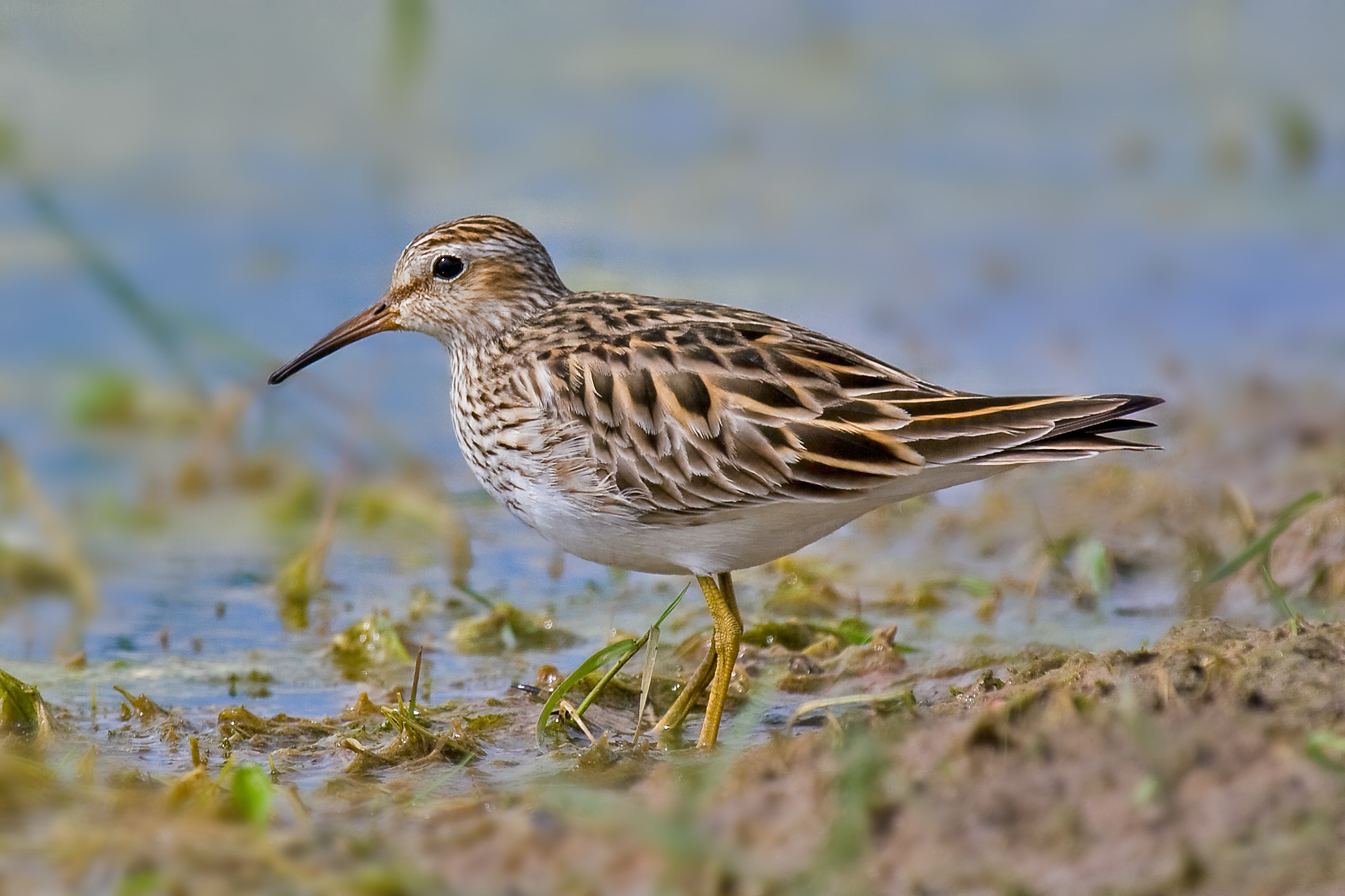
Pectoral sandpiper

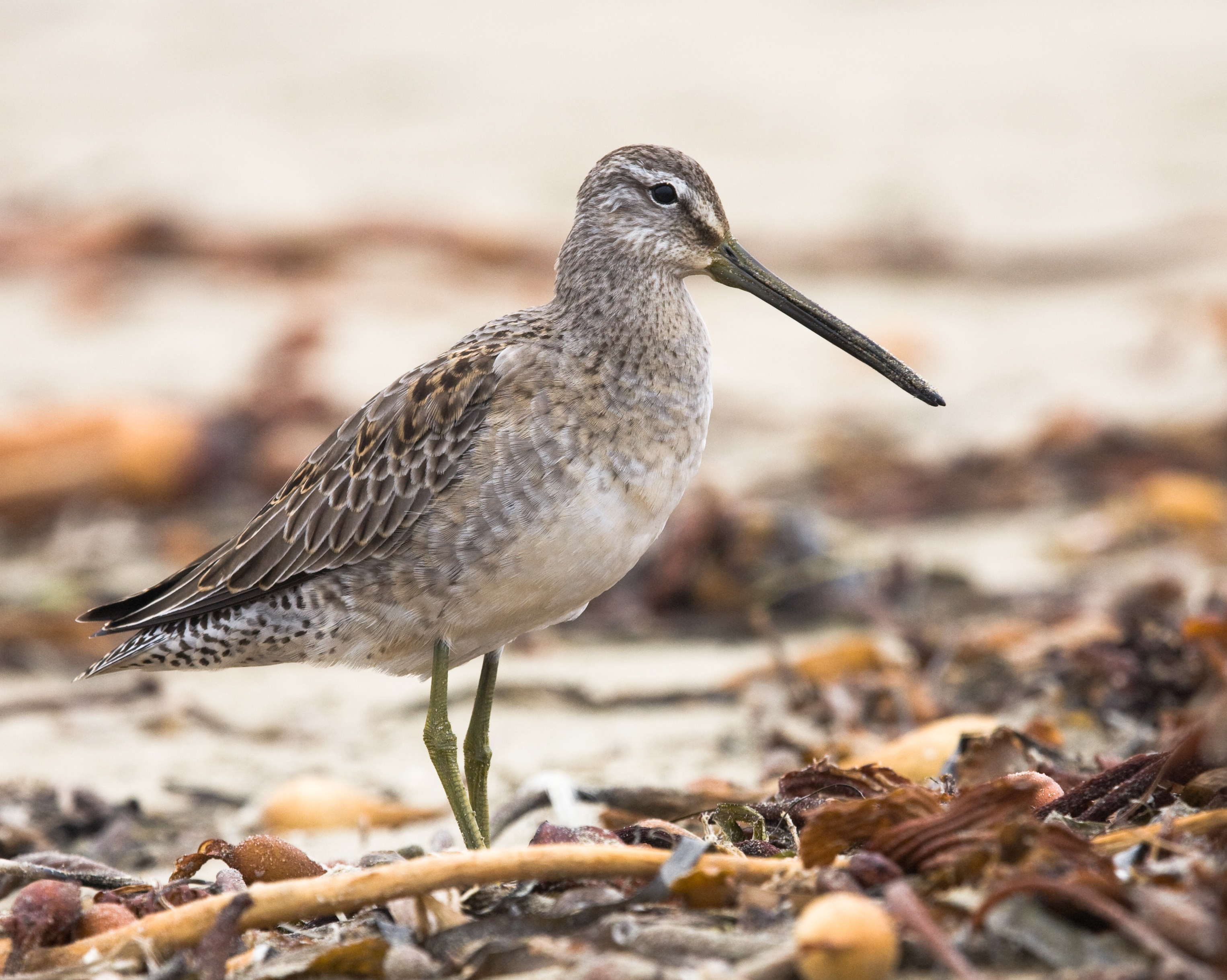
Long-billed dowitcher

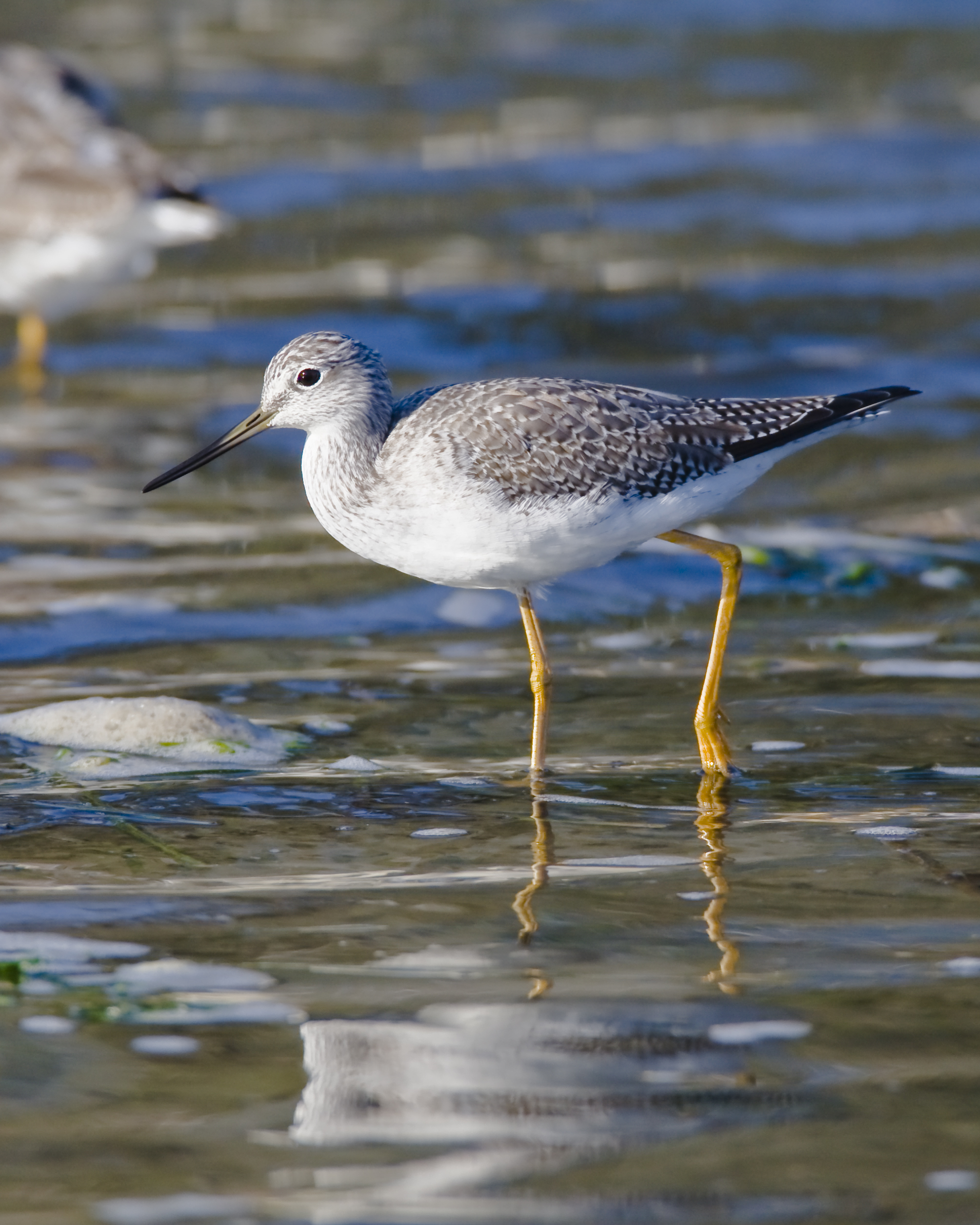
Greater yellowlegs

Order: Charadriiformes Family: Scolopacidae

Scolopacidae is a large diverse family of small to medium-sized shorebirds including the sandpipers, curlews, godwits, shanks, tattlers, woodcocks, snipes, dowitchers, and phalaropes. The majority of these species eat small invertebrates picked out of the mud or soil. Different lengths of legs and bills enable multiple species to feed in the same habitat, particularly on the coast, without direct competition for food.

- Upland sandpiper, Bartramia longicauda (R)
- Bristle-thighed curlew, Numenius tahitiensis (R)
- Whimbrel, Numenius phaeopus
- Long-billed curlew, Numenius americanus
- Bar-tailed godwit, Limosa lapponica (R)
- Hudsonian godwit, Limosa haemastica (R)
- Marbled godwit, Limosa fedoa
- Ruddy turnstone, Arenaria interpres
- Black turnstone, Arenaria melanocephala
- Great knot, Calidris tenuirostris (R)
- Red knot, Calidris canutus
- Surfbird, Calidris virgata
- Ruff, Calidris pugnax
- Sharp-tailed sandpiper, Calidris acuminata
- Stilt sandpiper, Calidris himantopus
- Curlew sandpiper, Calidris ferruginea (R)
- Long-toed stint, Calidris subminuta (R)
- Red-necked stint, Calidris ruficollis (R)
- Sanderling, Calidris alba
- Dunlin, Calidris alpina
- Rock sandpiper, Calidris ptilocnemis
- Baird's sandpiper, Calidris bairdii
- Little stint, Calidris minuta (R)
- Least sandpiper, Calidris minutilla
- White-rumped sandpiper, Calidris fuscicollis (R)
- Buff-breasted sandpiper, Calidris subruficollis
- Pectoral sandpiper, Calidris melanotos
- Semipalmated sandpiper, Calidris pusilla
- Western sandpiper, Calidris mauri
- Short-billed dowitcher, Limnodromus griseus
- Long-billed dowitcher, Limnodromus scolopaceus
- Jack snipe, Lymnocryptes minimus (R)
- Wilson's snipe, Gallinago delicata
- Spotted sandpiper, Actitis macularius
- Solitary sandpiper, Tringa solitaria
- Wandering tattler, Tringa incanus
- Lesser yellowlegs, Tringa flavipes
- Willet, Tringa semipalmata
- Spotted redshank, Tringa erythropus (R)
- Greater yellowlegs, Tringa melanoleuca
- Wood sandpiper, Tringa glareola (R)
- Wilson's phalarope, Phalaropus tricolor
- Red-necked phalarope, Phalaropus lobatus
- Red phalarope, Phalaropus fulicarius

== Skuas and jaegers ==
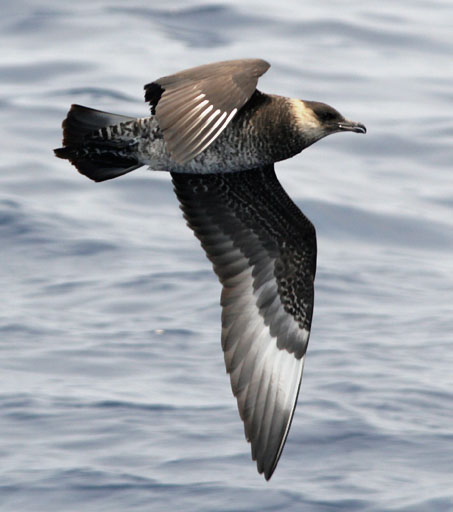
Pomarine jaeger

Order: Charadriiformes Family: Stercorariidae

Skuas and jaegers are in general medium to large birds, typically with gray or brown plumage, often with white markings on the wings. They have longish bills with hooked tips and webbed feet with sharp claws. They look like large dark gulls, but have a fleshy cere above the upper mandible. They are strong, acrobatic fliers.

- South polar skua, Stercorarius maccormicki
- Pomarine jaeger, Stercorarius pomarinus
- Parasitic jaeger, Stercorarius parasiticus
- Long-tailed jaeger, Stercorarius longicaudus

== Auks, murres, and puffins ==
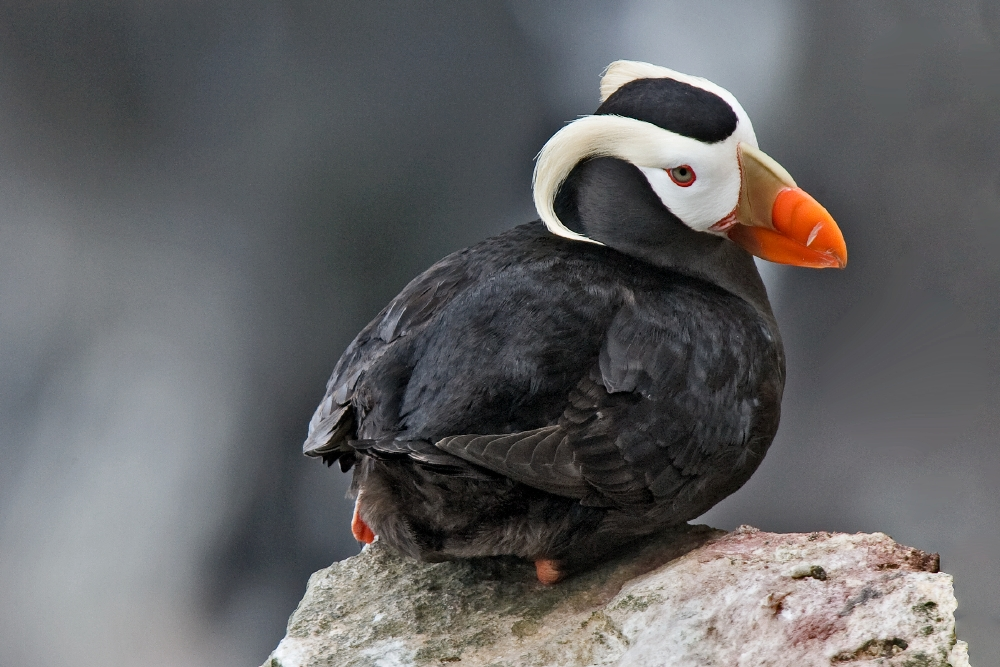
Tufted puffin

Order: Charadriiformes Family: Alcidae

Alcids are superficially similar to penguins due to their black-and-white colors, their upright posture, and some of their habits. However, they are only distantly related to the penguins and are able to fly. Auks live on the open sea, only deliberately coming ashore to nest.

- Common murre, Uria aalge
- Thick-billed murre, Uria lomvia (R)
- Pigeon guillemot, Cepphus columba
- Long-billed murrelet, Brachyramphus perdix (R)
- Marbled murrelet, Brachyramphus marmoratus
- Scripps's murrelet, Synthliboramphus scrippsi
- Guadalupe murrelet, Synthliboramphus hypoleucus (R)
- Ancient murrelet, Synthliboramphus antiquus
- Cassin's auklet, Ptychoramphus aleuticus
- Parakeet auklet, Aethia psittacula
- Rhinoceros auklet, Cerorhinca monocerata
- Horned puffin, Fratercula corniculata
- Tufted puffin, Fratercula cirrhata

== Gulls, terns, and skimmers ==
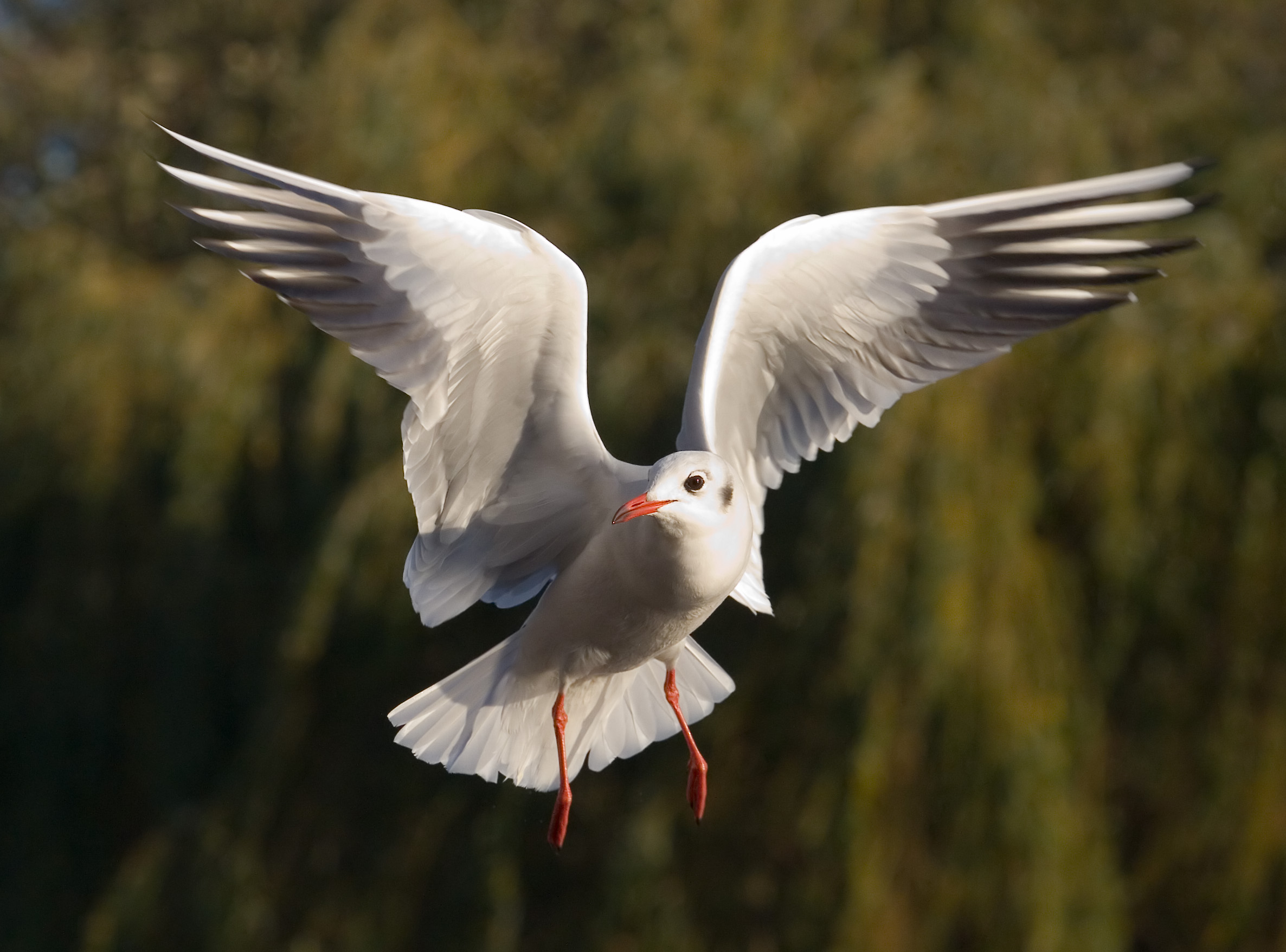
Black-headed gull

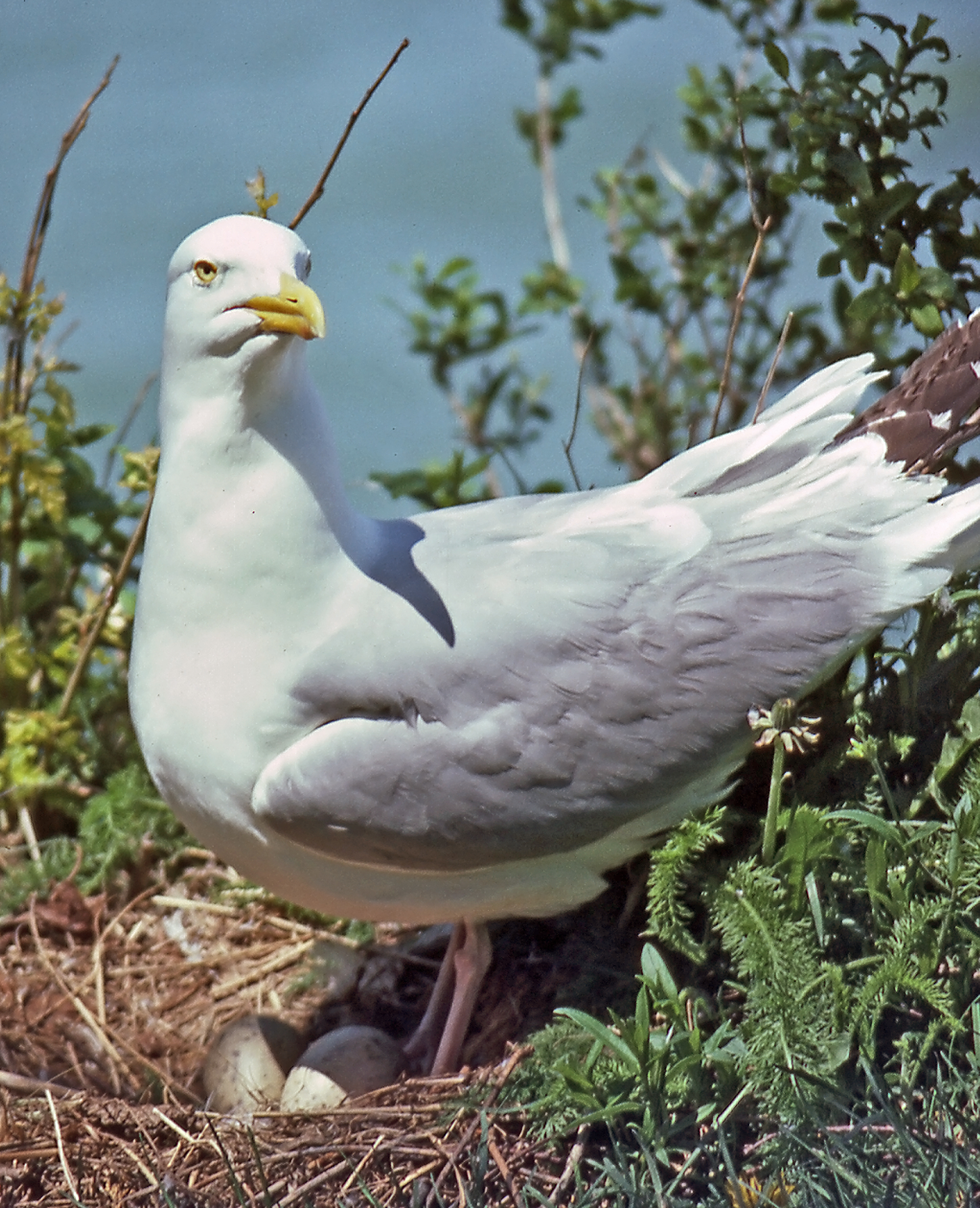
Herring gull

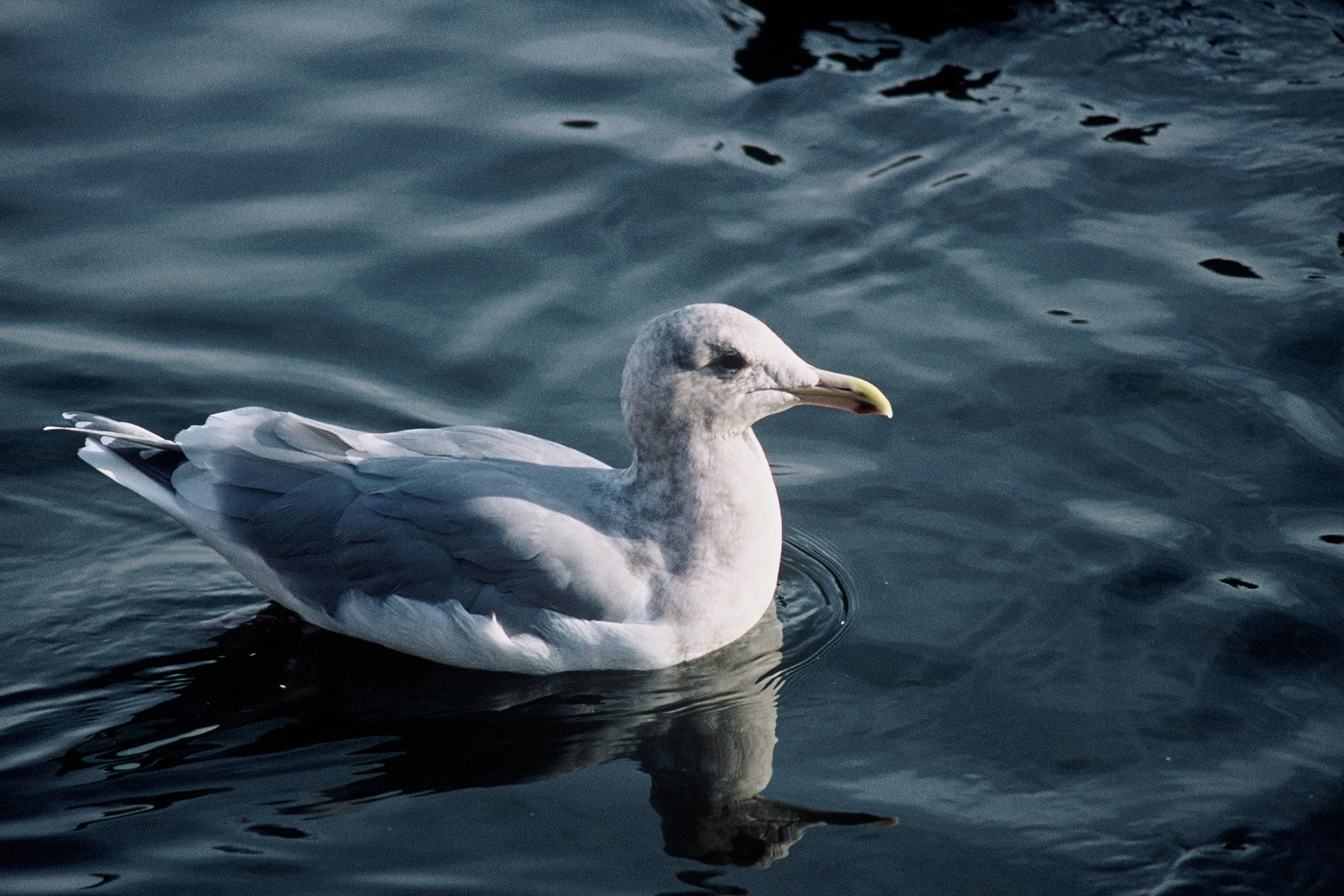
Glaucous-winged gull

Order: Charadriiformes Family: Laridae

Laridae is a family of medium to large seabirds and includes gulls, terns, kittiwakes, and skimmers. They are typically gray or white, often with black markings on the head or wings. They have stout, longish bills and webbed feet.

- Black-legged kittiwake, Rissa tridactyla
- Red-legged kittiwake, Rissa brevirostris (R)
- Sabine's gull, Xema sabini
- Bonaparte's gull, Chroicocephalus philadelphia
- Black-headed gull, Chroicocephalus ridibundus (R)
- Little gull, Hydrocoloeus minutus (R)
- Ross's gull, Rhodostethia rosea (R)
- Laughing gull, Leucophaeus atricilla (R)
- Franklin's gull, Leucophaeus pipixcan
- Heermann's gull, Larus heermanni
- Short-billed gull, Larus brachyrhynchus
- Ring-billed gull, Larus delawarensis
- Western gull, Larus occidentalis
- California gull, Larus californicus
- American herring gull, Larus smithsonianus
- Iceland gull, Larus glaucoides
- Lesser black-backed gull, Larus fuscus (R)
- Slaty-backed gull, Larus schistisagus (R)
- Glaucous-winged gull, Larus glaucescens
- Glaucous gull, Larus hyperboreus
- Least tern, Sternula antillarum (R)
- Caspian tern, Hydroprogne caspia
- Black tern, Chlidonias niger
- Common tern, Sterna hirundo
- Arctic tern, Sterna paradisaea
- Forster's tern, Sterna forsteri
- Elegant tern, Thalasseus elegans
- Black skimmer, Rynchops niger (R) (P)

== Tropicbirds ==
Order: Phaethontiformes Family: Phaethontidae

Tropicbirds are slender white birds of tropical oceans with exceptionally long central tail feathers. Their long wings have black markings, as does the head.

- Red-billed tropicbird, Phaethon aethereus (R)

== Loons ==
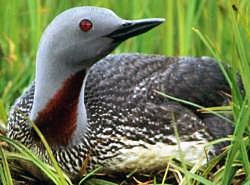
Red-throated loon

Order: Gaviiformes Family: Gaviidae

Loons are aquatic birds, the size of a large duck, to which they are unrelated. Their plumage is largely gray or black, and they have spear-shaped bills. Loons swim well and fly adequately, but are almost hopeless on land, because their legs are placed towards the rear of the body.

- Red-throated loon, Gavia stellata
- Arctic loon, Gavia arctica (R)
- Pacific loon, Gavia pacifica
- Common loon, Gavia immer
- Yellow-billed loon, Gavia adamsii

== Albatrosses ==
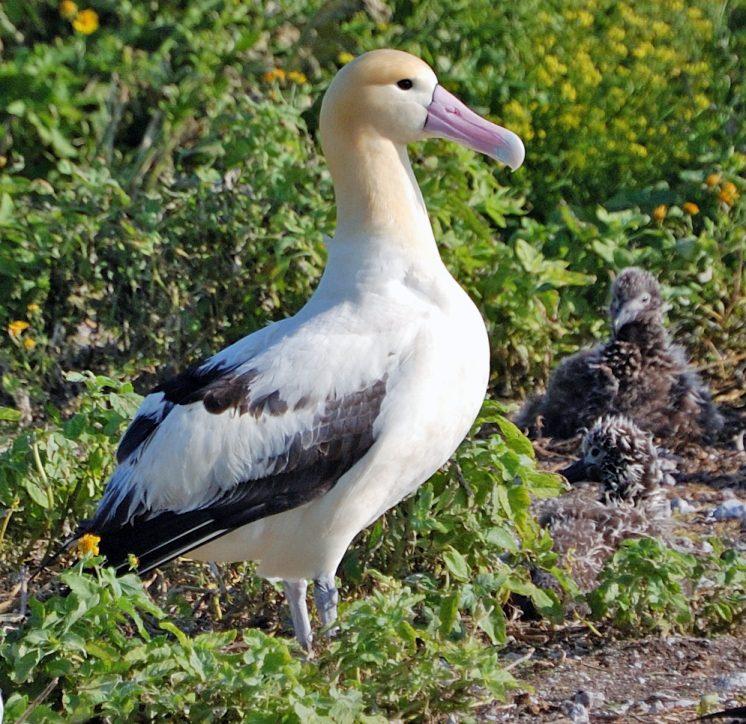
Short-tailed albatross

Order: Procellariiformes Family: Diomedeidae

The albatrosses are amongst the largest of flying birds, and the great albatrosses from the genus Diomedea have the largest wingspans of any extant birds.

- White-capped albatross, Thalassarche cauta (R)
- Wandering albatross, Diomedea exulans (R)
- Laysan albatross, Phoebastria immutabilis
- Black-footed albatross, Phoebastria nigripes
- Short-tailed albatross, Phoebastria albatrus (R)

== Southern storm-petrels ==
Order: Procellariiformes Family: Oceanitidae

The storm-petrels are the smallest seabirds, relatives of the petrels, feeding on planktonic crustaceans and small fish picked from the surface, typically while hovering. The flight is fluttering and sometimes bat-like. Until 2018, this family's three species were included with the other storm-petrels in family Hydrobatidae.

- Wilson's storm-petrel, Oceanites oceanicus (R)

== Northern storm-petrels ==
Order: Procellariiformes Family: Hydrobatidae

Though the members of this family are similar in many respects to the southern storm-petrels, including their general appearance and habits, there are enough genetic differences to warrant their placement in a separate family.

- Fork-tailed storm-petrel, Hydrobates furcatus
- Leach's storm-petrel, Hydrobates leucorhous
- Ashy storm-petrel, Hydrobates homochroa (R)
- Black storm-petrel, Hydrobates melania (R)

== Shearwaters and petrels ==
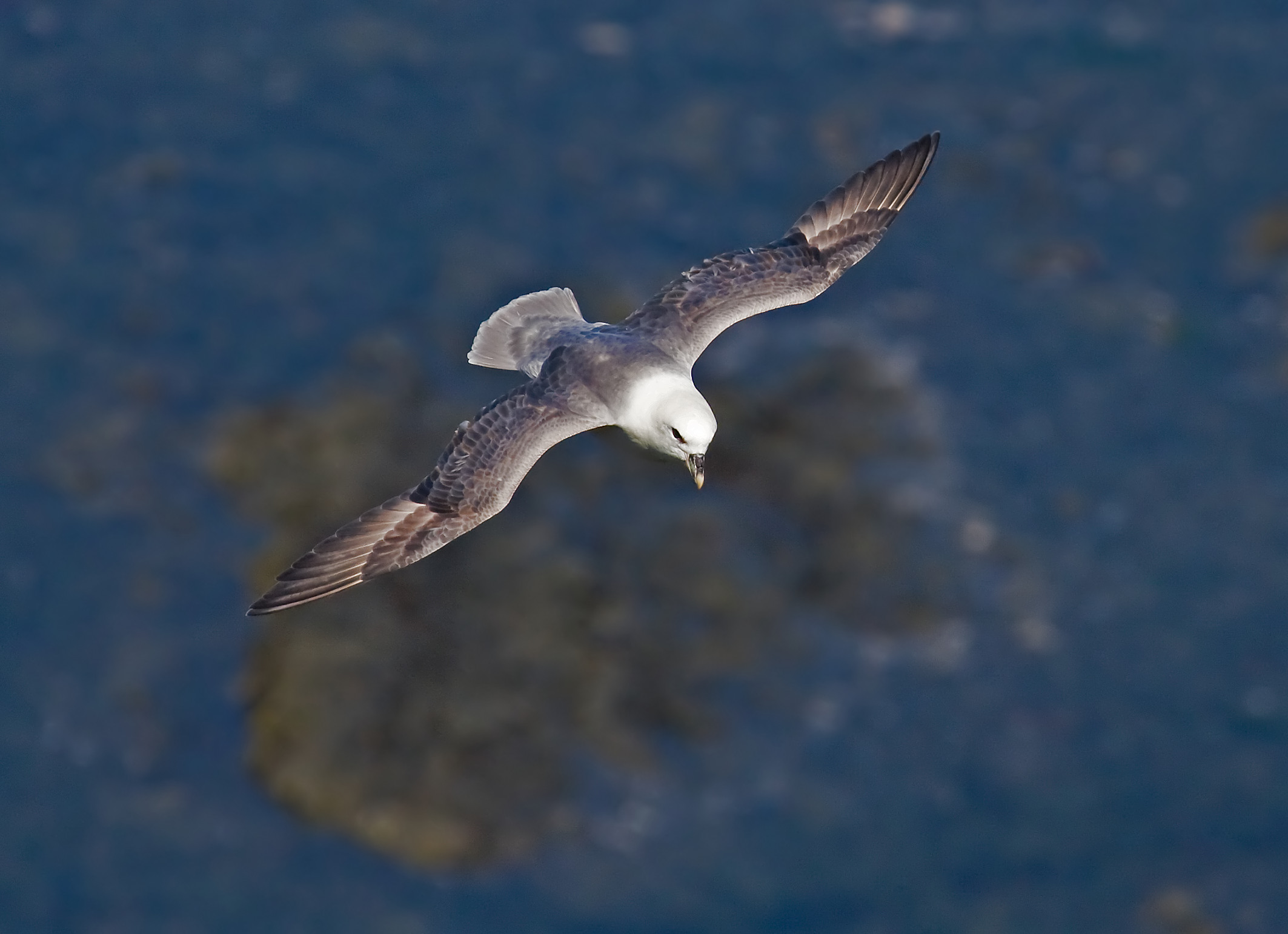
Northern fulmar

Order: Procellariiformes Family: Procellariidae

The procellariids are the main group of medium-sized "true petrels", characterized by united nostrils with medium septum and a long outer functional primary.

- Northern fulmar, Fulmarus glacialis
- Murphy's petrel, Pterodroma ultima
- Mottled petrel, Pterodroma inexpectata
- Juan Fernandez petrel, Pterodroma externa (R) (P)
- Hawaiian petrel, Pterodroma sandwichensis
- Cook's petrel, Pterodroma cookii (R)
- Stejneger's petrel, Pterodroma longirostris (R) (P)
- Streaked shearwater, Calonectris leucomelas (R) (P)
- Wedge-tailed shearwater, Ardenna pacificus (R)
- Buller's shearwater, Ardenna bulleri
- Short-tailed shearwater, Ardenna tenuirostris
- Sooty shearwater, Ardenna griseus
- Great shearwater, Ardenna gravis (R)
- Pink-footed shearwater, Ardenna creatopus
- Flesh-footed shearwater, Ardenna carneipes
- Manx shearwater, Puffinus puffinus
- Black-vented shearwater, Puffinus opisthomelas (R) (P)

== Frigatebirds ==
Order: Suliformes Family: Fregatidae

Frigatebirds are large seabirds usually found over tropical oceans. They are large, black or black-and-white, with long wings and deeply forked tails. The males have colored inflatable throat pouches. They do not swim or walk and cannot take off from a flat surface. Having the largest wingspan-to-body-weight ratio of any bird, they are essentially aerial, able to stay aloft for more than a week.

- Magnificent frigatebird, Fregata magnificens (R)

== Boobies and gannets ==
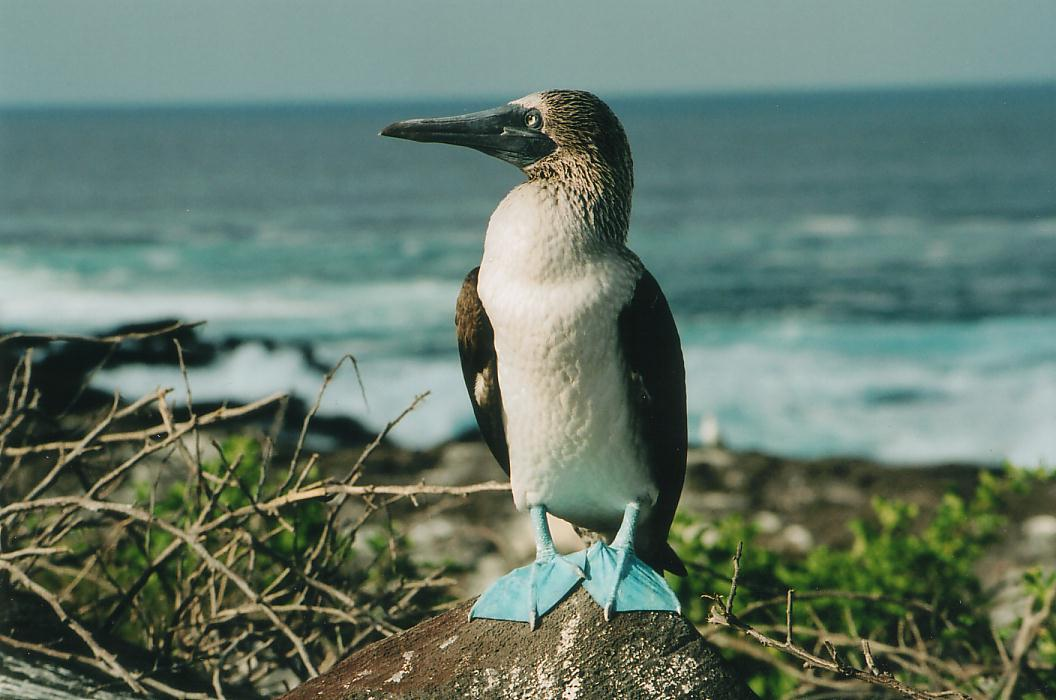
Blue-footed booby

Order: Suliformes Family: Sulidae

The sulids comprise the gannets and boobies. Both groups are medium-large coastal seabirds that plunge-dive for fish.

- Masked booby, Sula dactylatra (R)
- Nazca booby, Sula granti (R)
- Blue-footed booby, Sula nebouxii (R)
- Brown booby, Sula leucogaster (R)
- Red-footed booby, Sula sula (R)

== Cormorants and shags ==
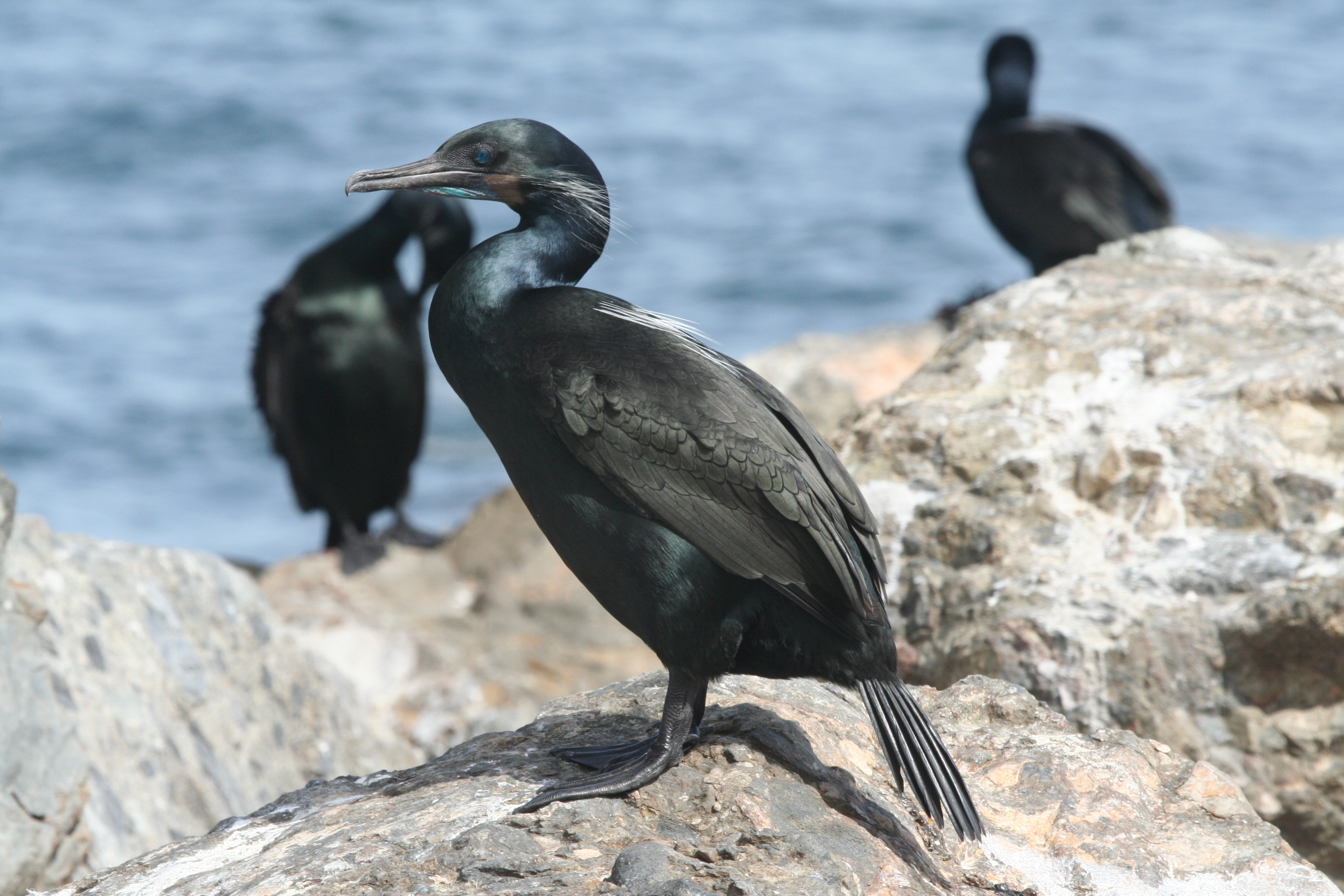
Brandt's cormorant

Order: Suliformes Family: Phalacrocoracidae

Cormorants are medium-to-large aquatic birds, usually with mainly dark plumage and areas of colored skin on the face. The bill is long, thin, and sharply hooked. Their feet are four-toed and webbed.

- Brandt's cormorant, Urile penicillatus
- Pelagic cormorant, Nannopterum auritum
- Double-crested cormorant, Nannopterum brasilianum

== Pelicans ==
Order: Pelecaniformes Family: Pelecanidae

Pelicans are very large water birds with a distinctive pouch under their beak. Like other birds in the order Pelecaniformes, they have four webbed toes.

- American white pelican, Pelecanus erythrorhynchos
- Brown pelican, Pelecanus occidentalis

== Herons, egrets, and bitterns ==
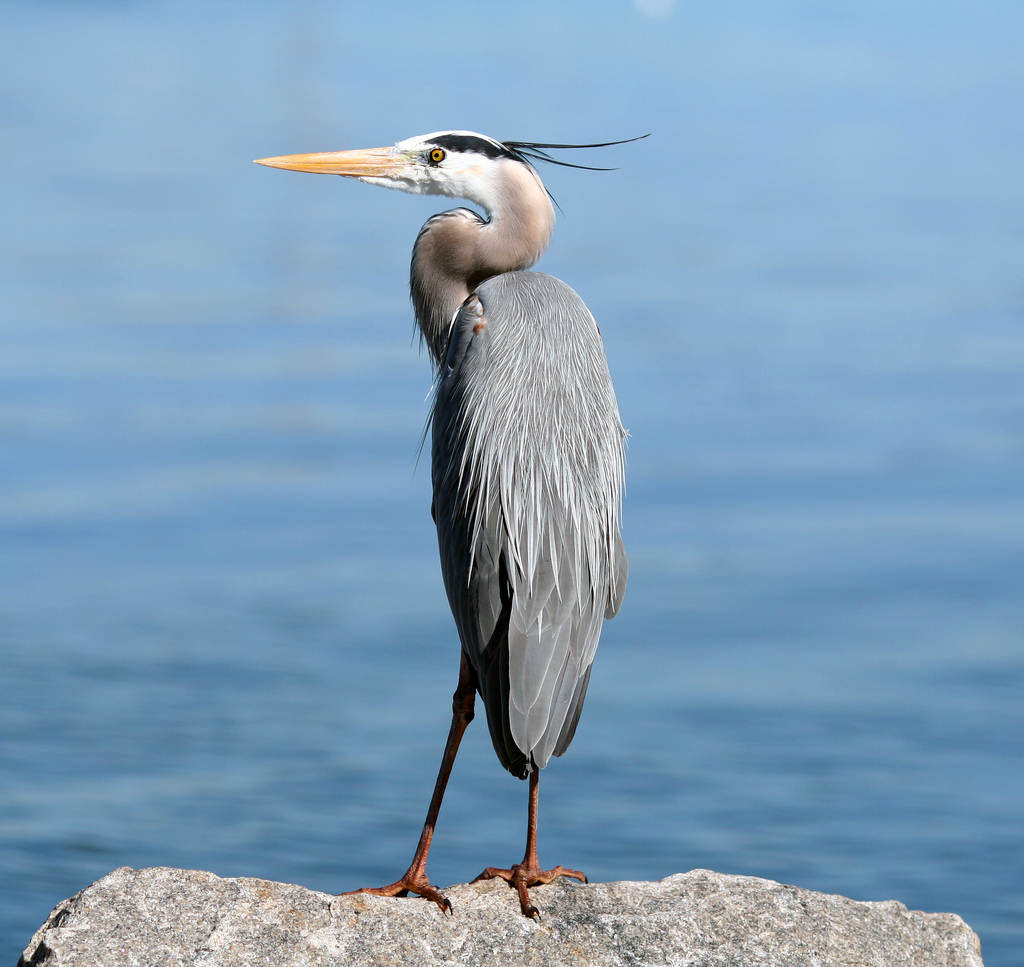
Great blue heron

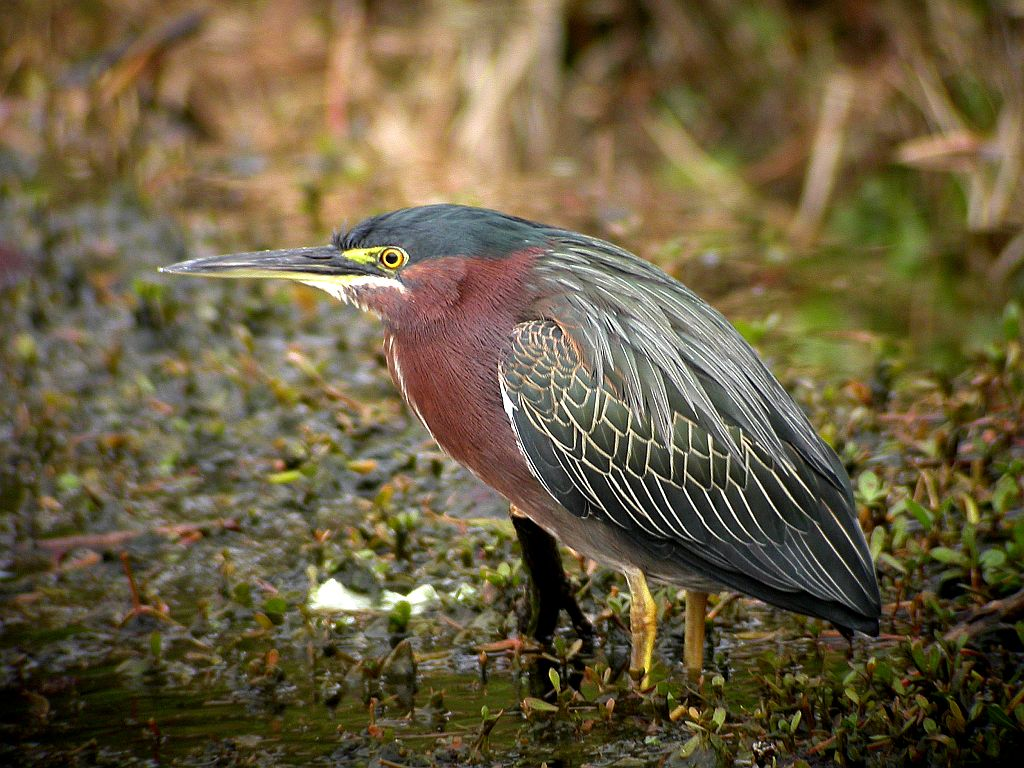
Green heron

Order: Pelecaniformes Family: Ardeidae

The family Ardeidae contains the herons, egrets, and bitterns. Herons and egrets are medium to large wading birds with long necks and legs. Bitterns tend to be shorter-necked and more secretive. Members of Ardeidae fly with their necks retracted, unlike other long-necked birds such as storks, ibises, and spoonbills.

- American bittern, Botaurus lentiginosus
- Least bittern, Ixobrychus exilis (R)
- Great blue heron, Ardea herodias
- Great egret, Ardea alba
- Snowy egret, Egretta thula
- Little blue heron, Egretta caerulea (R)
- Tricolored heron, Egretta tricolor (R)
- Cattle egret, Bubulcus ibis
- Green heron, Butorides virescens
- Black-crowned night-heron, Nycticorax nycticorax
- Yellow-crowned night-heron, Nyctanassa violacea (R)

== Ibises and spoonbills ==
Order: Pelecaniformes Family: Threskiornithidae

The family Threskiornithidae includes the ibises and spoonbills. They have long, broad wings. Their bodies tend to be elongated, the neck more so, with rather long legs. The bill is also long, decurved in the case of the ibises, straight and distinctively flattened in the spoonbills.

- White ibis, Eudocimus albus (R)
- Glossy ibis, Plegadis falcinellus (R)
- White-faced ibis, Plegadis chihi

== New World vultures ==
Order: Cathartiformes Family: Cathartidae

The New World vultures are not closely related to Old World vultures, but superficially resemble them because of convergent evolution. Like the Old World vultures, they are scavengers. However, unlike Old World vultures, which find carcasses by sight, New World vultures have a good sense of smell with which they locate carcasses.

- California condor, Gymnogyps californianus (R) vagrant
- Black vulture, Coragyps atratus (R)
- Turkey vulture, Cathartes aura

== Osprey ==
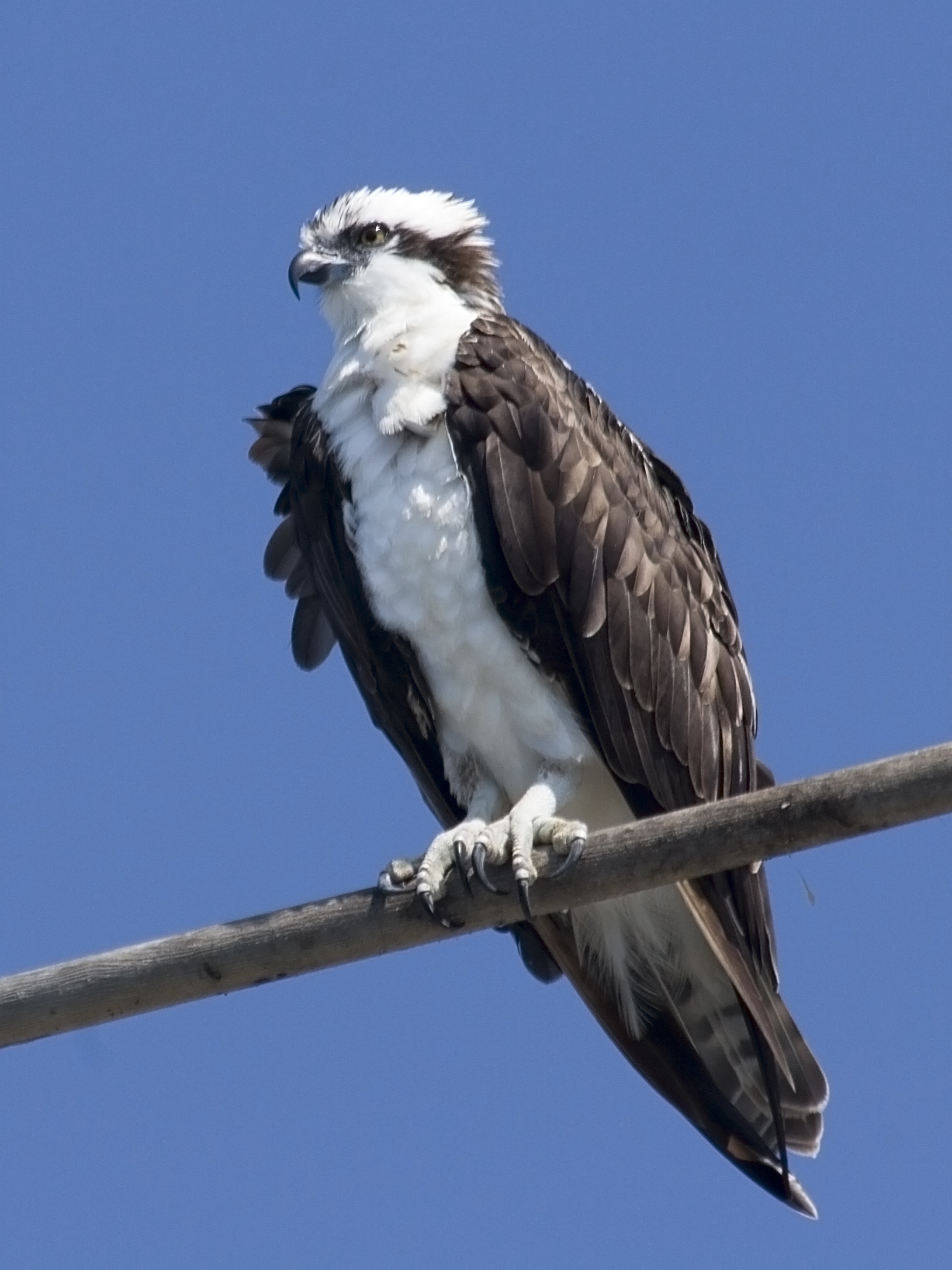
Osprey

Order: Accipitriformes Family: Pandionidae

Pandionidae is a monotypic family of fish-eating birds of prey. Its single species possesses a very large and powerful hooked beak, strong legs, strong talons, and keen eyesight.

- Osprey, Pandion haliaetus

== Hawks, eagles, and kites ==
Order: Accipitriformes Family: Accipitridae

Accipitridae is a family of birds of prey which includes hawks, eagles, kites, harriers, and Old World vultures. These birds have very large powerful hooked beaks for tearing flesh from their prey, strong legs, powerful talons, and keen eyesight.

- White-tailed kite, Elanus leucurus
- Golden eagle, Aquila chrysaetos
- Northern harrier, Circus hudsonius
- Sharp-shinned hawk, Accipiter striatus
- Cooper's hawk, Accipiter cooperii
- American goshawk, Accipiter atricapillus
- Bald eagle, Haliaeetus leucocephalus
- Red-shouldered hawk, Buteo lineatus
- Broad-winged hawk, Buteo platypterus
- Swainson's hawk, Buteo swainsoni
- Zone-tailed hawk, Buteo albonotatus (R)
- Red-tailed hawk, Buteo jamaicensis
- Rough-legged hawk, Buteo lagopus
- Ferruginous hawk, Buteo regalis

== Barn-owls ==
Order: Strigiformes Family: Tytonidae

Barn-owls are medium to large owls with large heads and characteristic heart-shaped faces. They have long strong legs with powerful talons.

- Barn owl, Tyto alba

== Owls ==
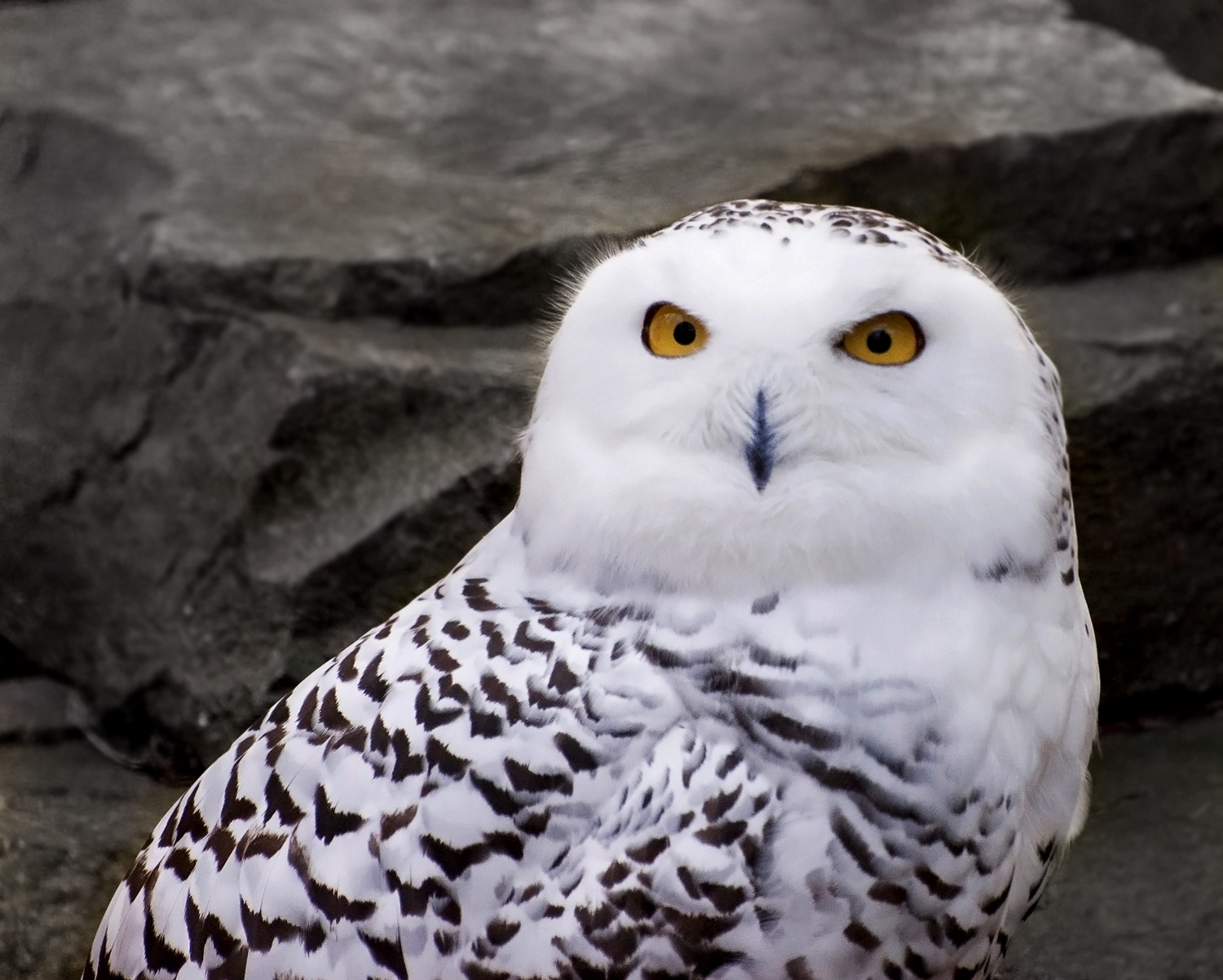
Snowy owl

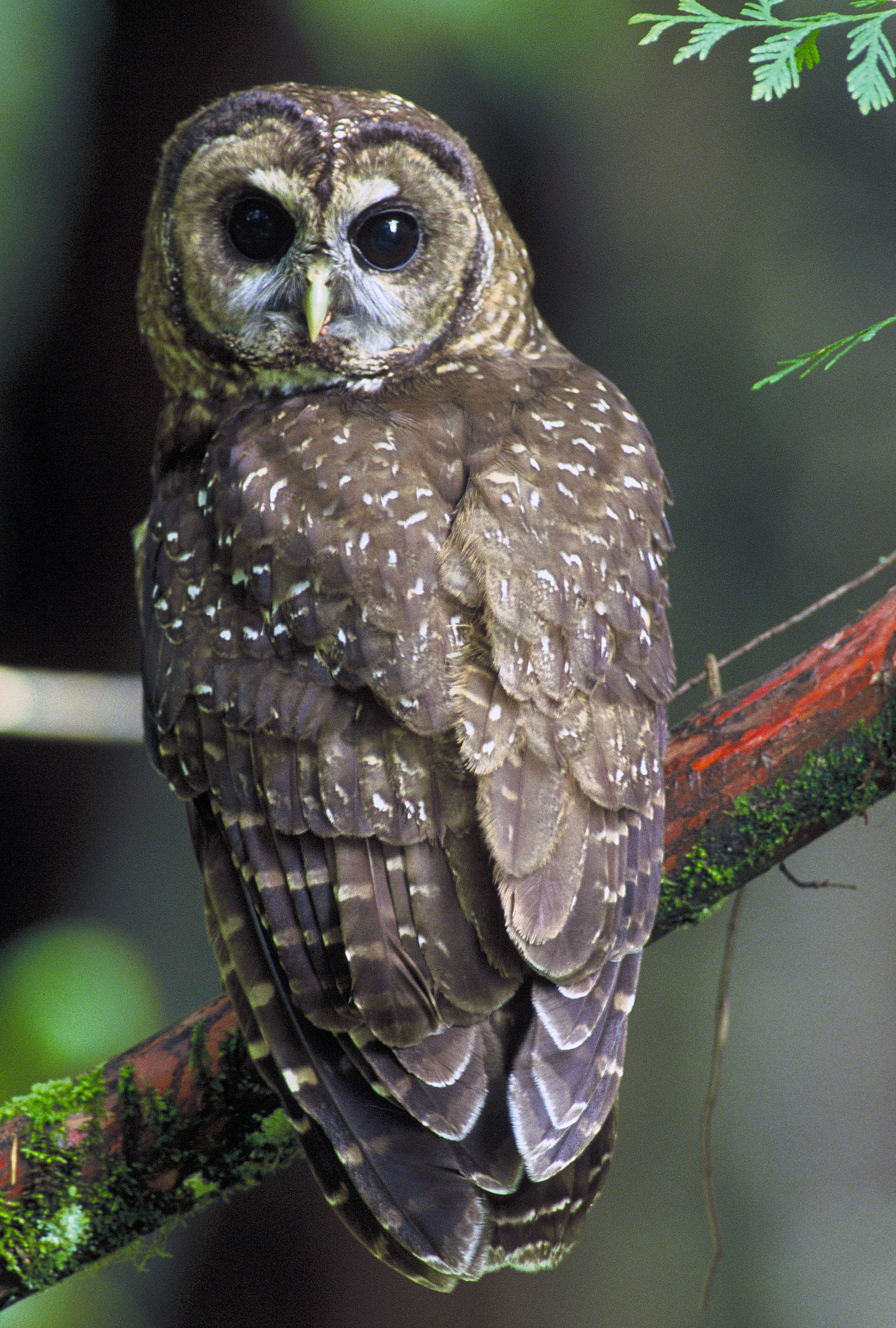
Spotted owl

Order: Strigiformes Family: Strigidae

Typical owls are small to large solitary nocturnal birds of prey. They have large forward-facing eyes and ears, a hawk-like beak, and a conspicuous circle of feathers around each eye called a facial disk.

- Flammulated owl, Psiloscops flammeolus
- Western screech-owl, Megascops kennicottii
- Great horned owl, Bubo virginianus
- Snowy owl, Bubo scandiacus
- Northern hawk owl, Surnia ulula (R)
- Northern pygmy-owl, Glaucidium gnoma
- Burrowing owl, Athene cunicularia
- Spotted owl, Strix occidentalis
- Barred owl, Strix varia
- Great gray owl, Strix nebulosa
- Long-eared owl, Asio otus
- Short-eared owl, Asio flammeus
- Boreal owl, Aegolius funereus
- Northern saw-whet owl, Aegolius acadicus

== Kingfishers ==
Order: Coraciiformes Family: Alcedinidae

Kingfishers are medium-sized birds with large heads, long pointed bills, short legs, and stubby tails.

- Belted kingfisher, Megaceryle alcyon

== Woodpeckers ==
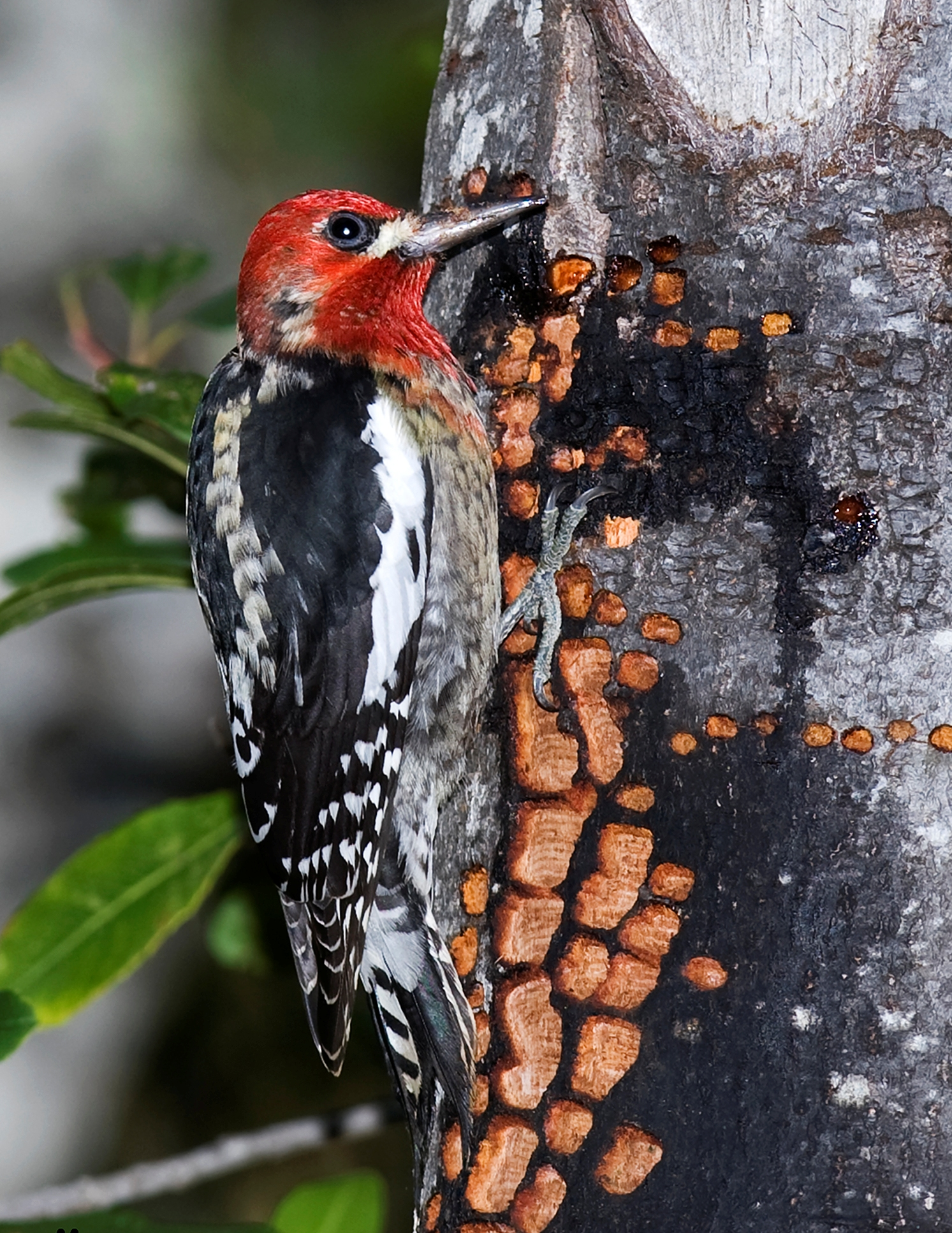
Red-breasted sapsucker

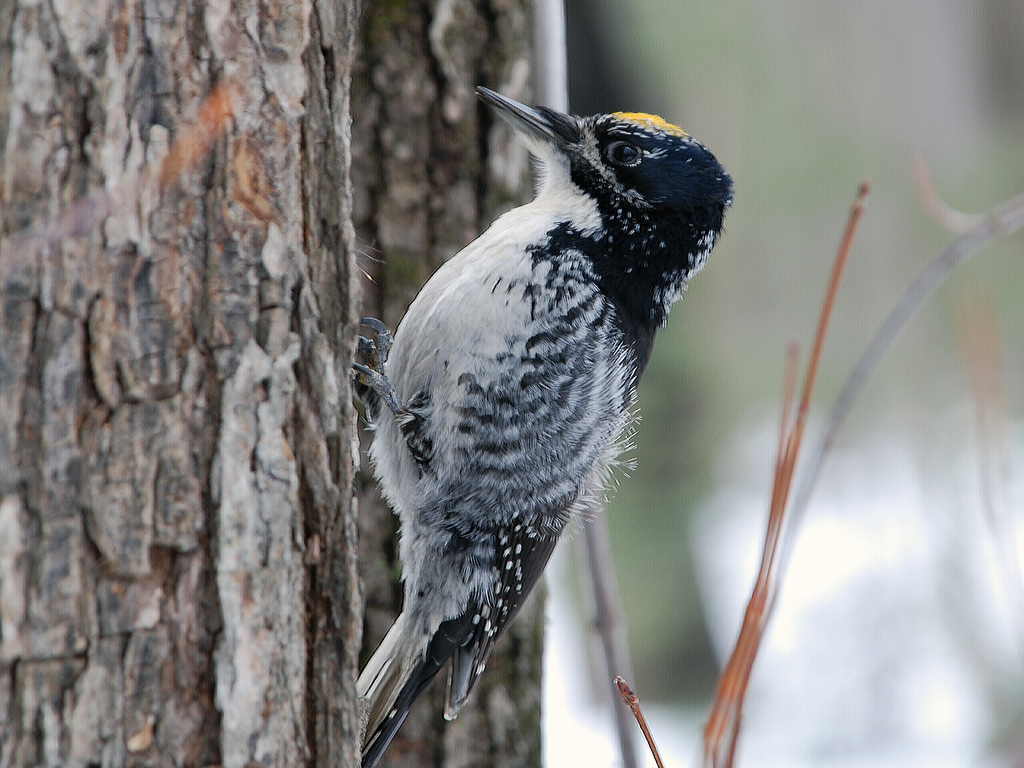
American three-toed woodpecker

Order: Piciformes Family: Picidae

Woodpeckers are small to medium-sized birds with chisel-like beaks, short legs, stiff tails, and long tongues used for capturing insects. Some species have feet with two toes pointing forward and two backward, while several species have only three toes. Many woodpeckers have the habit of tapping noisily on tree trunks with their beaks.

- Lewis's woodpecker, Melanerpes lewis
- Red-headed woodpecker, Melanerpes erythrocephalus (R)
- Acorn woodpecker, Melanerpes formicivorus
- Red-bellied woodpecker, Melanerpes carolinus (R)
- Williamson's sapsucker, Sphyrapicus thyroideus
- Yellow-bellied sapsucker, Sphyrapicus varius
- Red-naped sapsucker, Sphyrapicus nuchalis
- Red-breasted sapsucker, Sphyrapicus ruber
- American three-toed woodpecker, Picoides dorsalis
- Black-backed woodpecker, Picoides arcticus
- Downy woodpecker, Dryobates pubescens
- Nuttall's woodpecker, Dryobates nuttallii (R)
- Hairy woodpecker, Dryobates villosus
- White-headed woodpecker, Dryobates albolarvatus
- Northern flicker, Colaptes auratus
- Pileated woodpecker, Dryocopus pileatus

== Falcons and caracaras ==
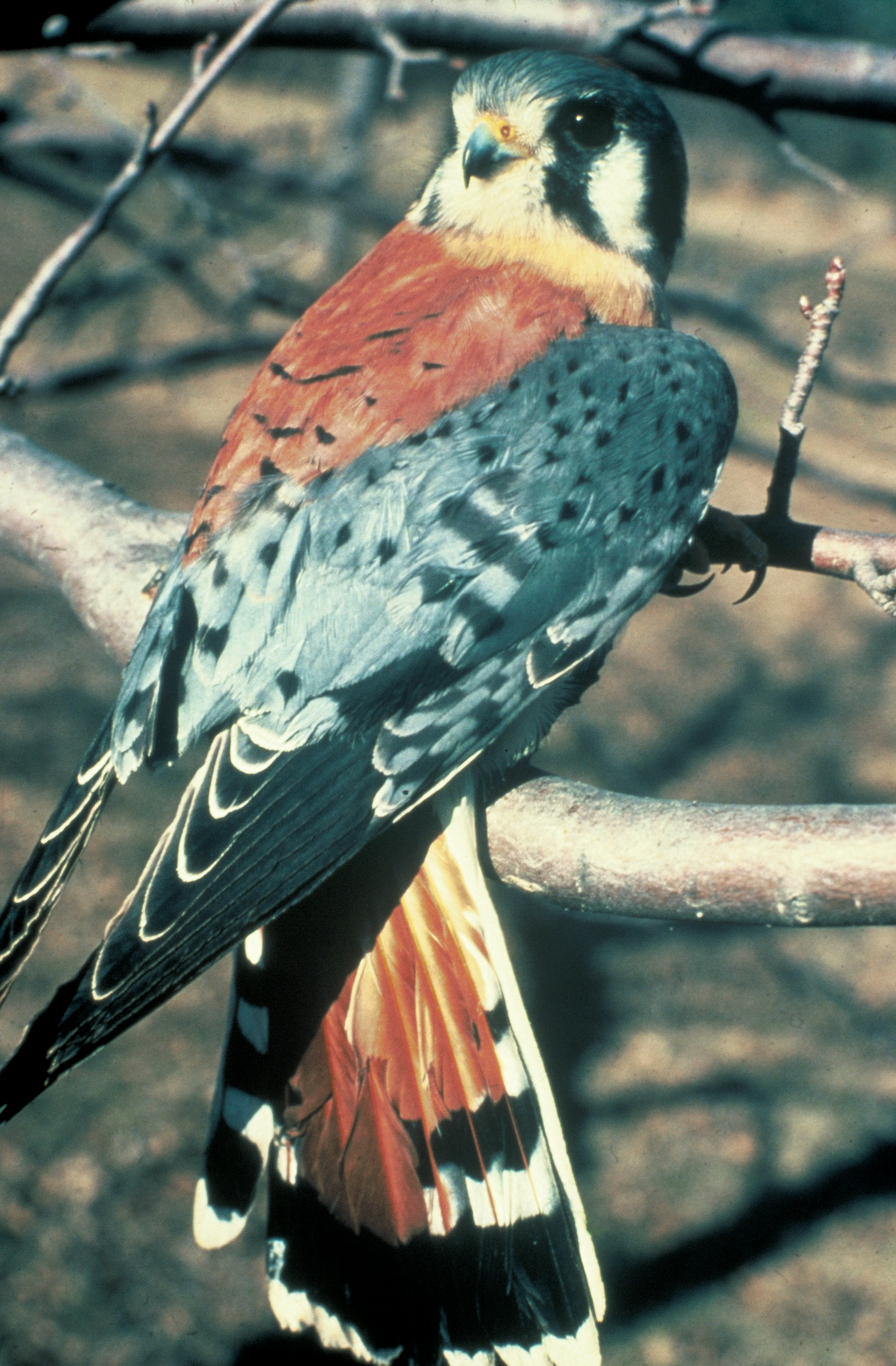
American kestrel

Order: Falconiformes Family: Falconidae

Falconidae is a family of diurnal birds of prey, notably the falcons and caracaras. They differ from hawks, eagles, and kites in that they kill with their beaks instead of their talons.

- Crested caracara, Caracara plancus (R)
- American kestrel, Falco sparverius
- Merlin, Falco columbarius
- Gyrfalcon, Falco rusticolus
- Peregrine falcon, Falco peregrinus
- Prairie falcon, Falco mexicanus

== Tyrant flycatchers ==
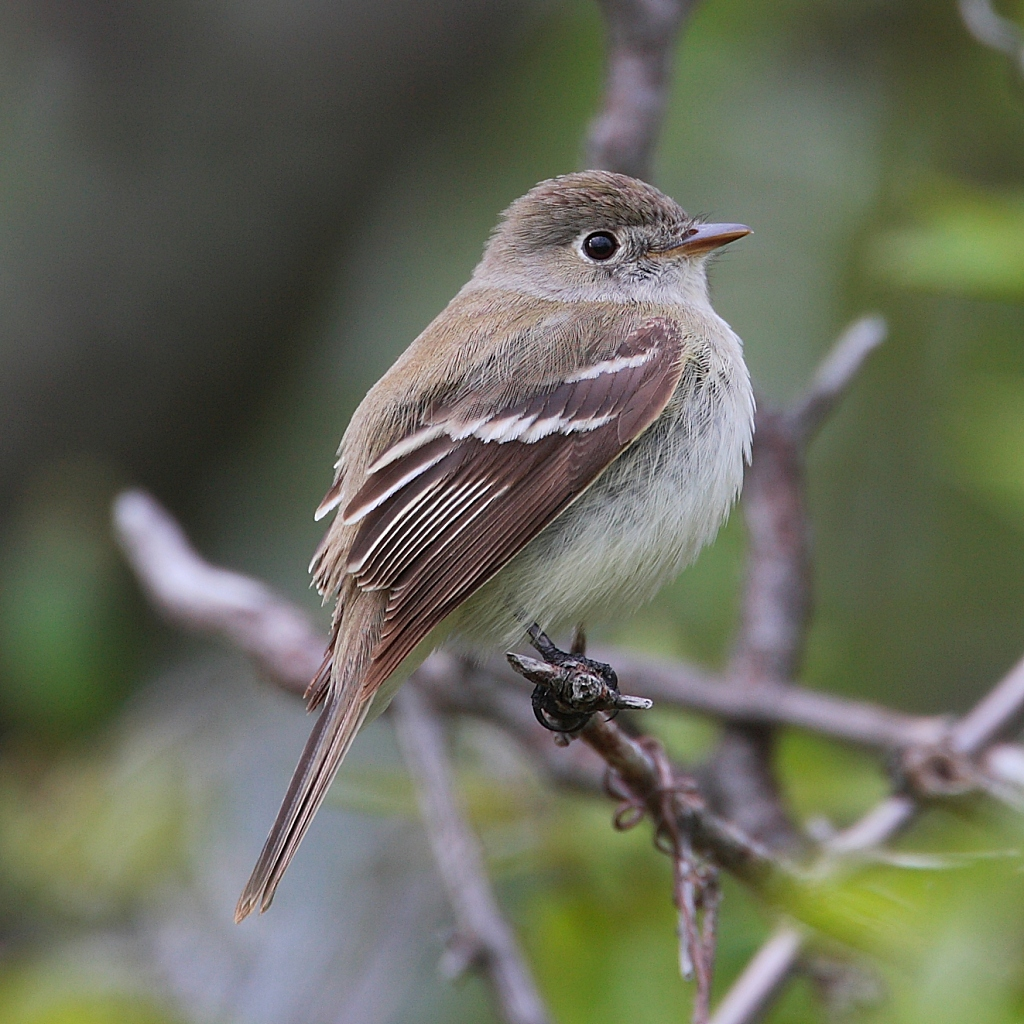
Least flycatcher

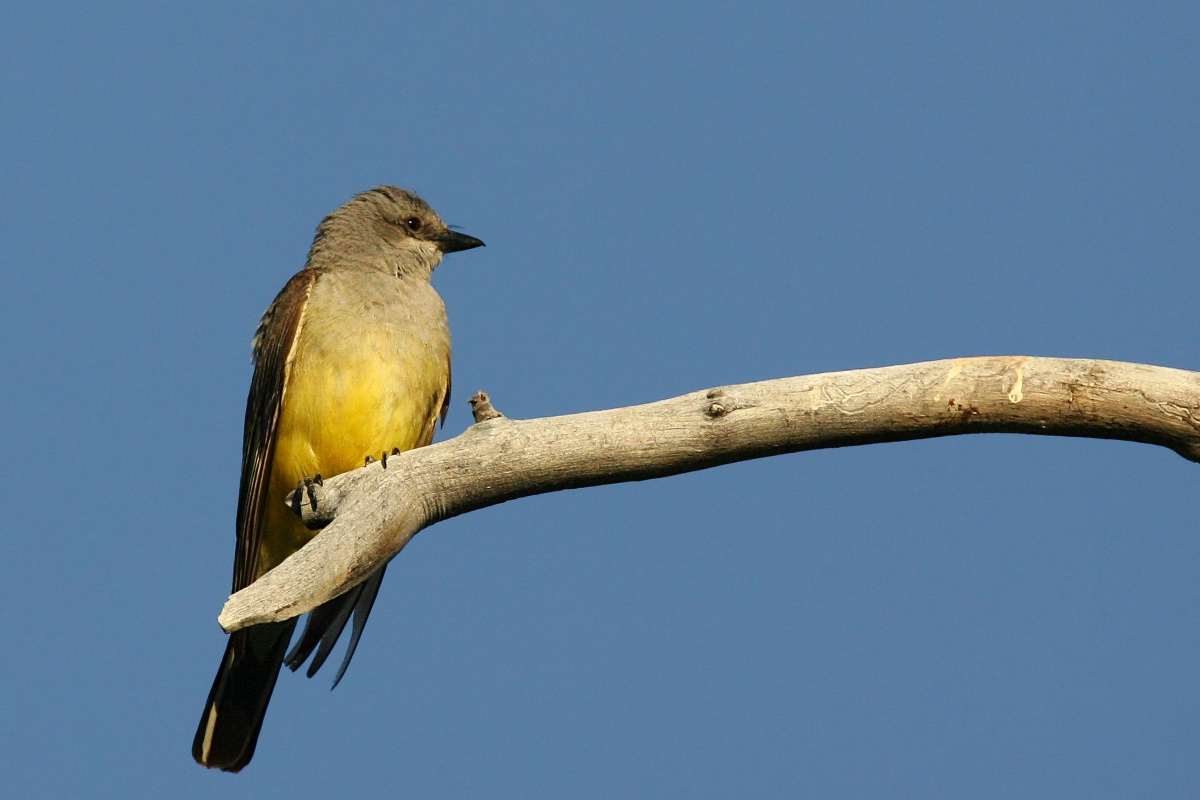
Cassin's kingbird

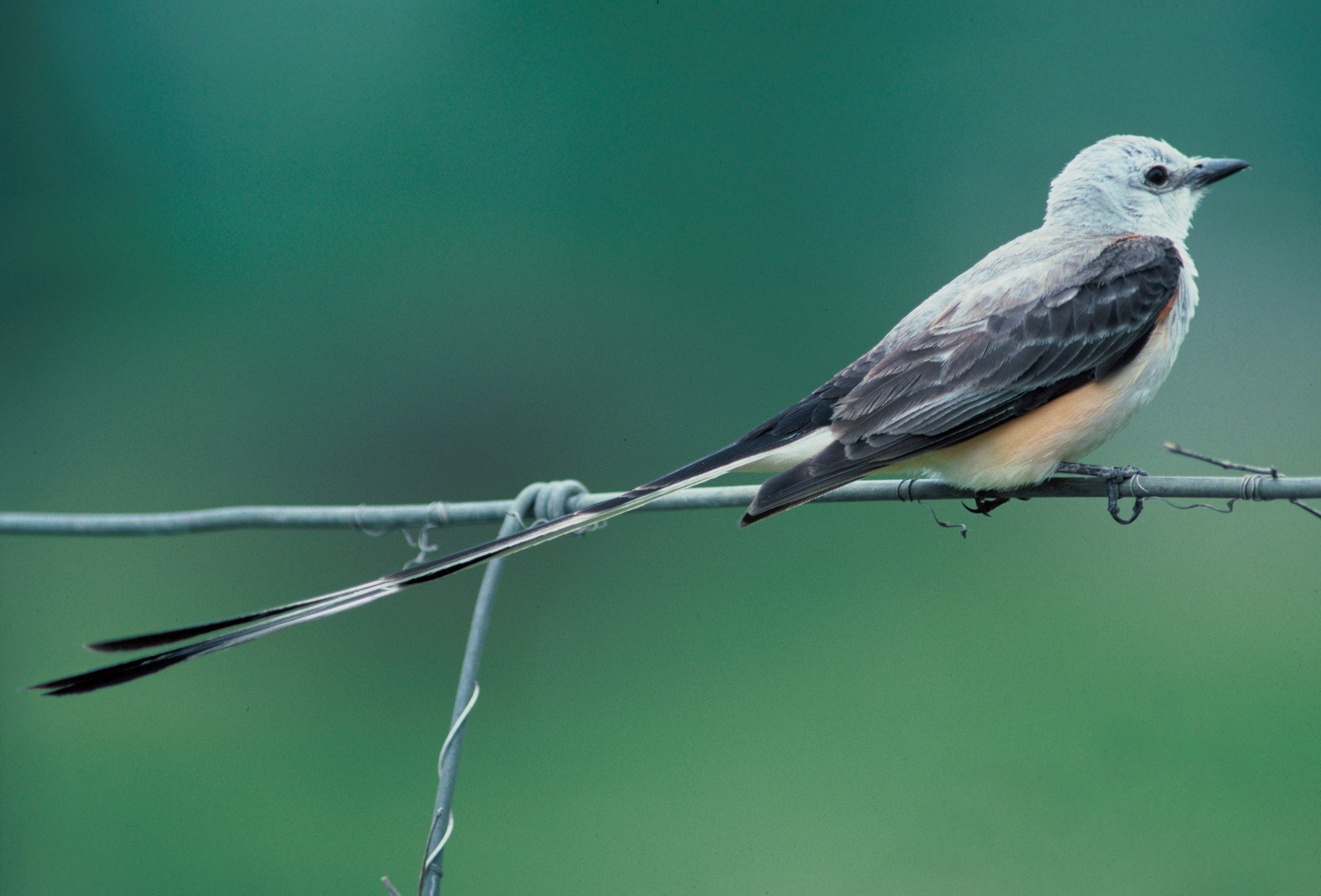
Scissor-tailed flycatcher

Order: Passeriformes Family: Tyrannidae

Tyrant flycatchers are Passerine birds which occur throughout North and South America. They superficially resemble the Old World flycatchers, but are more robust and have stronger bills. They do not have the sophisticated vocal capabilities of the songbirds. Most, but not all, are rather plain. As the name implies, most are insectivorous.

- Dusky-capped flycatcher, Myiarchus tuberculifer (R)
- Ash-throated flycatcher, Myiarchus cinerascens
- Great crested flycatcher, Myiarchus crinitus (R)
- Tropical kingbird, Tyrannus melancholicus
- Cassin's kingbird, Tyrannus vociferans (R)
- Western kingbird, Tyrannus verticalis
- Eastern kingbird, Tyrannus tyrannus
- Scissor-tailed flycatcher, Tyrannus forficatus (R)
- Olive-sided flycatcher, Contopus cooperi
- Western wood-pewee, Contopus sordidulus
- Eastern wood-pewee, Contopus virens (R)
- Yellow-bellied flycatcher, Empidonax flaviventris (R)
- Alder flycatcher, Empidonax alnorum (R)
- Willow flycatcher, Empidonax traillii
- Least flycatcher, Empidonax minimus
- Hammond's flycatcher, Empidonax hammondii
- Gray flycatcher, Empidonax wrightii
- Dusky flycatcher, Empidonax oberholseri
- Western flycatcher, Empidonax difficilis
- Black phoebe, Sayornis nigricans
- Eastern phoebe, Sayornis phoebe (R)
- Say's phoebe, Sayornis saya
- Vermilion flycatcher, Pyrocephalus rubinus (R)

== Vireos, shrike-babblers, and erpornis ==
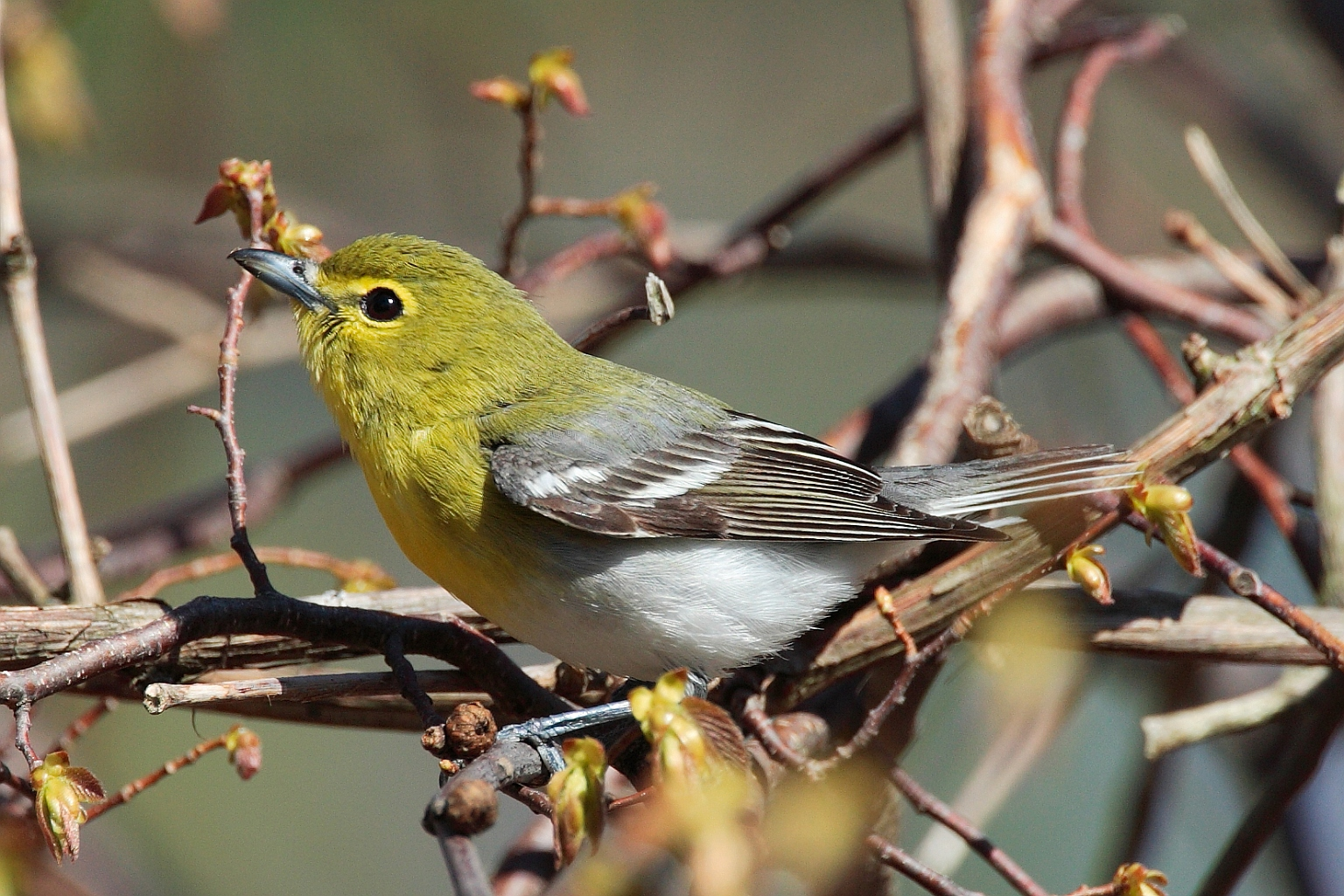
Yellow-throated vireo

Order: Passeriformes Family: Vireonidae

The vireos and greenlets are a group of small to medium-sized passerine birds mostly restricted to the New World, though a few members of the family, called shrike-babblers, are found in Asia. They are typically greenish in color and resemble wood-warblers apart from their heavier bills

- White-eyed vireo, Vireo griseus (R)
- Bell's vireo, Vireo bellii (R) (P)
- Hutton's vireo, Vireo huttoni
- Yellow-throated vireo, Vireo flavifrons (R)
- Cassin's vireo, Vireo cassinii
- Blue-headed vireo, Vireo solitarius (R)
- Plumbeous vireo, Vireo plumbeus (R)
- Philadelphia vireo, Vireo philadelphicus (R)
- Warbling vireo, Vireo gilvus
- Red-eyed vireo, Vireo olivaceus

== Shrikes ==
Order: Passeriformes Family: Laniidae

Shrikes are passerine birds known for their habit of catching other birds and small animals and impaling the uneaten portions of their bodies on thorns. A shrike's beak is hooked, like that of a typical bird of prey.

- Loggerhead shrike, Lanius ludovicianus
- Northern shrike, Lanius borealis

== Crows, jays, and magpies ==
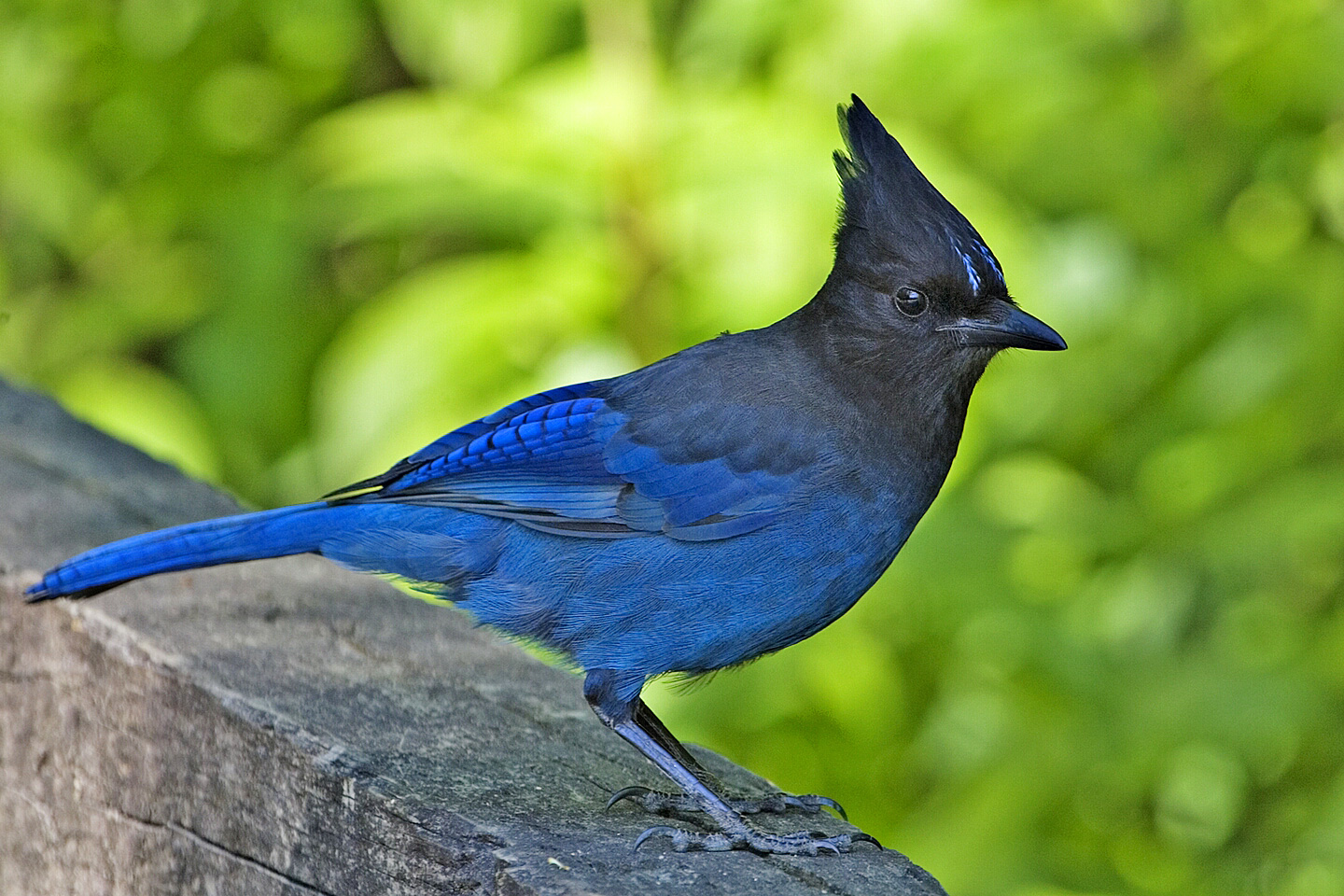
Steller's jay

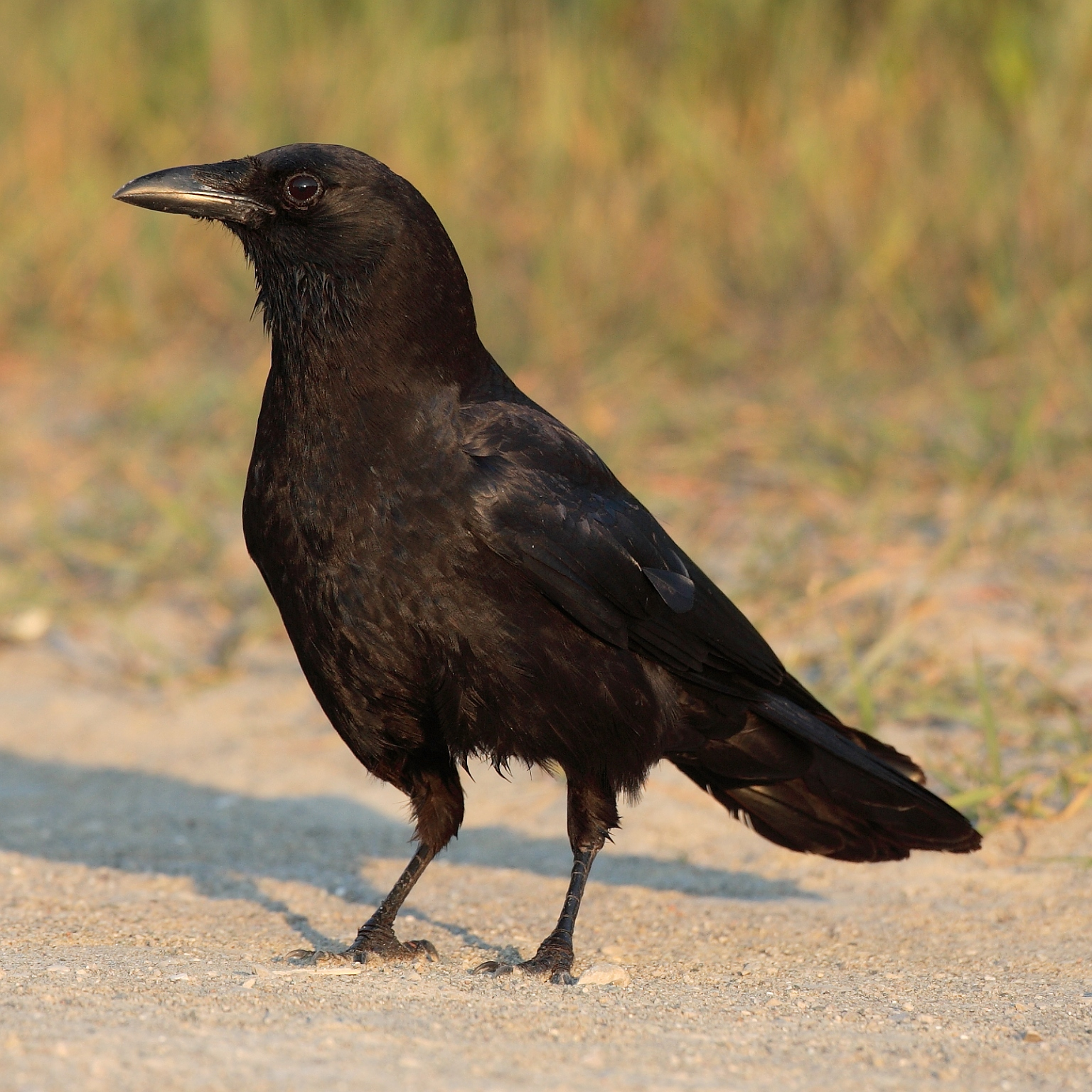
American crow

Order: Passeriformes Family: Corvidae

The family Corvidae includes crows, ravens, jays, choughs, magpies, treepies, nutcrackers, and ground jays. Corvids are above average in size among the Passeriformes, and some of the larger species show high levels of intelligence.

- Canada jay, Perisoreus canadensis
- Pinyon jay, Gymnorhinus cyanocephalus
- Steller's jay, Cyanocitta stelleri
- Blue jay, Cyanocitta cristata
- California scrub-jay, Aphelocoma californica
- Woodhouse's scrub-jay, Aphelocoma woodhouseii
- Clark's nutcracker, Nucifraga columbiana
- Black-billed magpie, Pica hudsonia
- American crow, Corvus brachyrhynchos
- Common raven, Corvus corax

== Tits, chickadees, and titmice ==
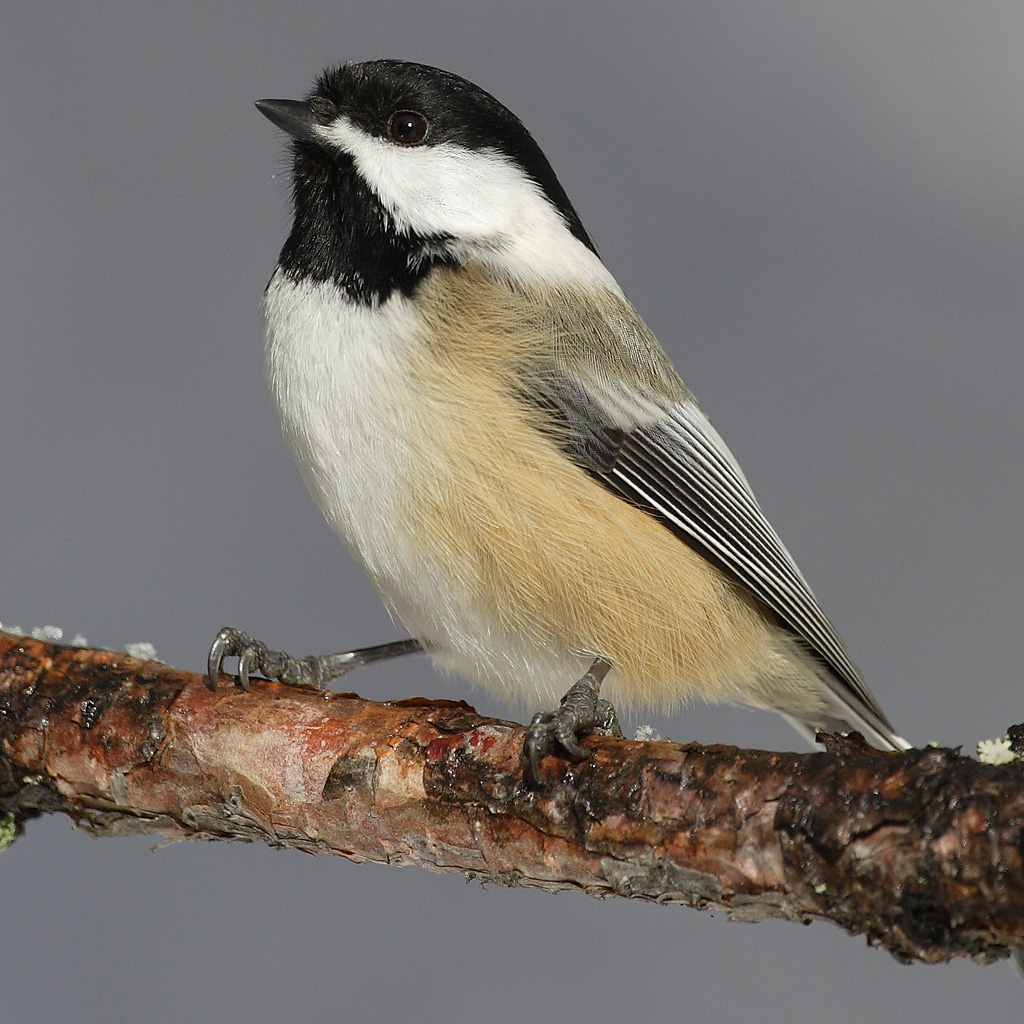
Black-capped chickadee

Order: Passeriformes Family: Paridae

The Paridae are mainly small stocky woodland species with short stout bills. Some have crests. They are adaptable birds, with a mixed diet including seeds and insects.

- Black-capped chickadee, Poecile atricapillus
- Mountain chickadee, Poecile gambeli
- Chestnut-backed chickadee, Poecile rufescens
- Oak titmouse, Baeolophus inornatus
- Juniper titmouse, Baeolophus ridgwayi

== Larks ==
Order: Passeriformes Family: Alaudidae

Larks are small terrestrial birds with often extravagant songs and display flights. Most larks are fairly dull in appearance. Their food is insects and seeds.

- Eurasian skylark, Alauda arvensis (R)
- Horned lark, Eremophila alpestris

== Swallows ==
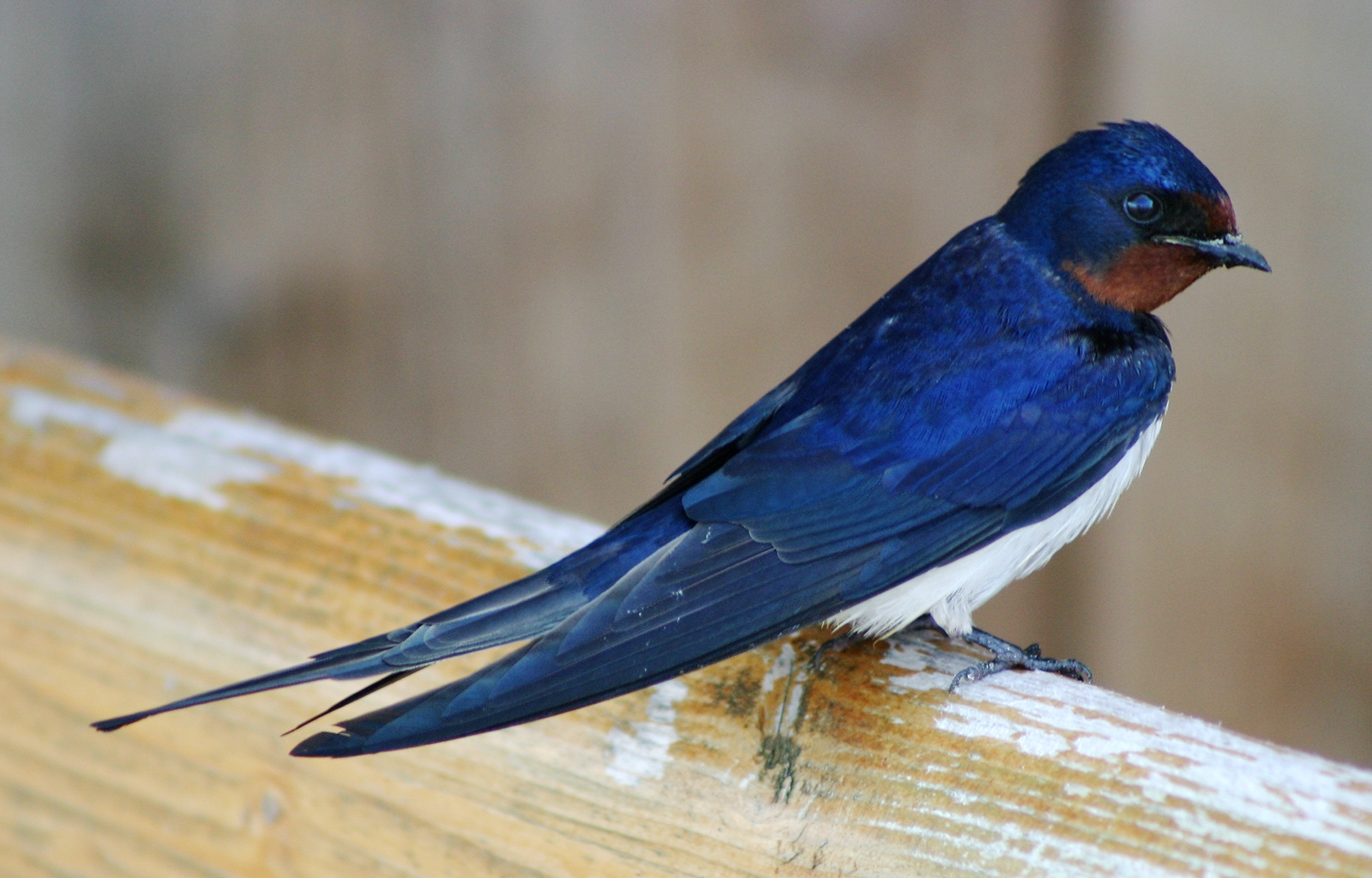
Barn swallow

Order: Passeriformes Family: Hirundinidae

The family Hirundinidae is adapted to aerial feeding. They have a slender streamlined body, long pointed wings, and a short bill with a wide gape. The feet are adapted to perching rather than walking, and the front toes are partially joined at the base.

- Bank swallow, Riparia riparia
- Tree swallow, Tachycineta bicolor
- Violet-green swallow, Tachycineta thalassina
- Northern rough-winged swallow, Stelgidopteryx serripennis
- Purple martin, Progne subis
- Barn swallow, Hirundo rustica
- Cliff swallow, Petrochelidon pyrrhonota
- Cave swallow, Petrochelidon fulva (R)

== Long-tailed tits ==
Order: Passeriformes Family: Aegithalidae

The long-tailed tits are a family of small passerine birds with medium to long tails. They make woven bag nests in trees. Most eat a mixed diet which includes insects.

- Bushtit, Psaltriparus minimus

== Leaf warblers ==
Order: Passeriformes Family: Phylloscopidae

Leaf warblers are a family of small insectivorous birds found mostly in Eurasia and ranging into Wallacea and Africa. The Arctic warbler breeds east into Alaska. The species are of various sizes, often green-plumaged above and yellow below, or more subdued with grayish-green to grayish-brown colors.

- Dusky warbler, Phylloscopus fuscatus (R)
- Arctic warbler, Phylloscopus borealis (R)

== Sylviid warblers, parrotbills, and allies ==
Order: Passeriformes Family: Sylviidae

The family Sylviidae is a group of small insectivorous passerine birds. They mainly occur as breeding species, as the common name implies, in Europe, Asia, and to a lesser extent Africa. Most are of generally undistinguished appearance, but many have distinctive songs.

- Wrentit, Chamaea fasciata

== Kinglets ==
Order: Passeriformes Family: Regulidae

The kinglets are a small family of birds which resemble the titmice. They are very small insectivorous birds. The adults have colored crowns, giving rise to their name.

- Ruby-crowned kinglet, Corphylio calendula
- Golden-crowned kinglet, Regulus satrapa

== Waxwings ==
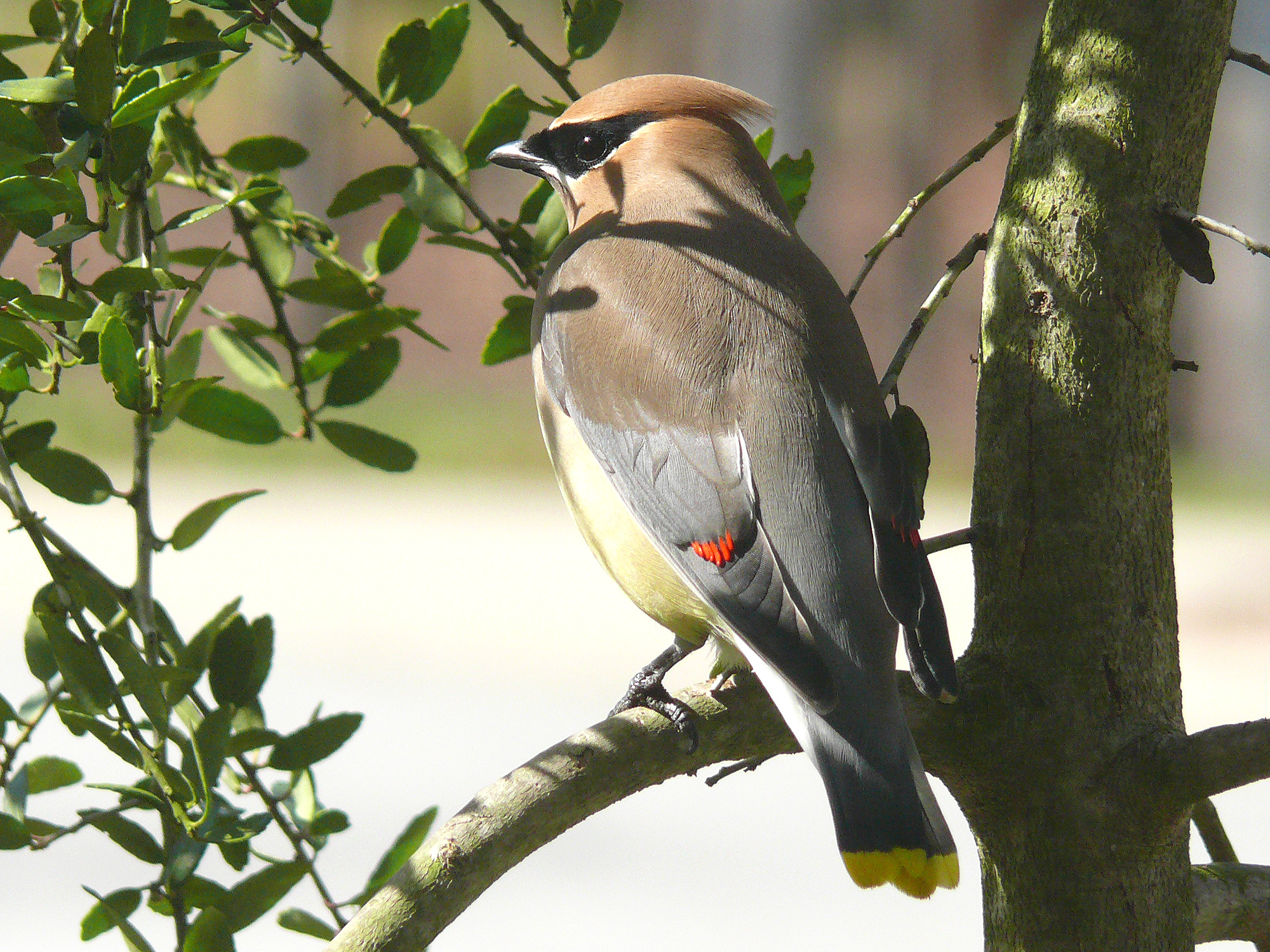
Cedar waxwing

Order: Passeriformes Family: Bombycillidae

The waxwings are a group of birds with soft silky plumage and unique red tips to some of the wing feathers. In the Bohemian and cedar waxwings, these tips look like sealing wax and give the group its name. These are arboreal birds of northern forests. They live on insects in summer and berries in winter.

- Bohemian waxwing, Bombycilla garrulus
- Cedar waxwing, Bombycilla cedrorum

== Silky-flycatchers ==
Order: Passeriformes Family: Ptiliogonatidae

The silky-flycatchers are a small family of passerine birds which occur mainly in Central America. They are related to waxwings and most species have small crests.

- Phainopepla, Phainopepla nitens (R)

== Nuthatches ==
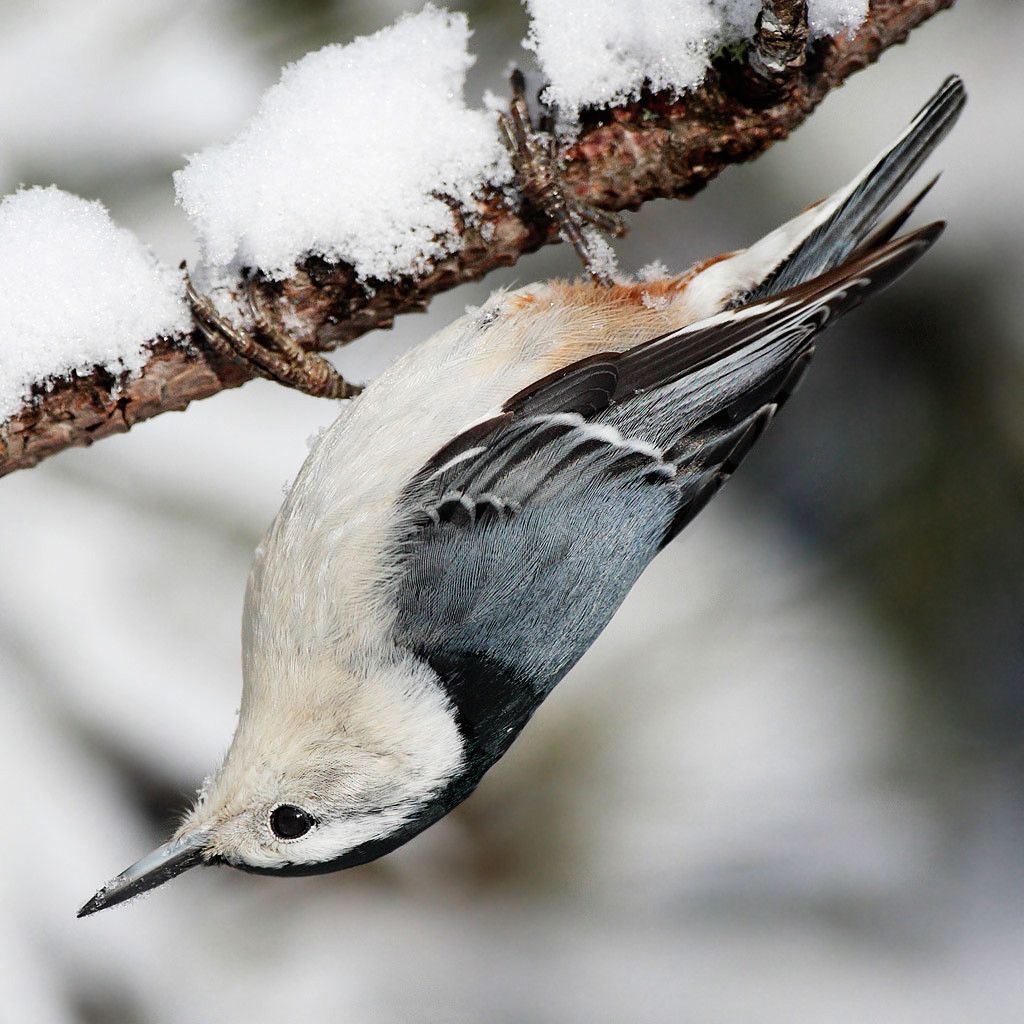
White-breasted nuthatch

Order: Passeriformes Family: Sittidae

Nuthatches are small woodland birds. They have the unusual ability to climb down trees head first, unlike other birds which can only go upwards. Nuthatches have big heads, short tails, and powerful bills and feet.

- Red-breasted nuthatch, Sitta canadensis
- White-breasted nuthatch, Sitta carolinensis
- Pygmy nuthatch, Sitta pygmaea

== Treecreepers ==
Order: Passeriformes Family: Certhiidae

Treecreepers are small woodland birds, brown above and white below. They have thin pointed down-curved bills, which they use to extricate insects from bark. They have stiff tail feathers, like woodpeckers, which they use to support themselves on vertical trees.

- Brown creeper, Certhia americana

== Gnatcatchers ==
Order: Passeriformes Family: Polioptilidae

These dainty birds resemble Old World warblers in their structure and habits, moving restlessly through the foliage seeking insects. The gnatcatchers are mainly soft bluish gray in color and have the typical insectivore's long sharp bill. Many species have distinctive black head patterns (especially males) and long, regularly cocked, black-and-white tails.

- Blue-gray gnatcatcher, Polioptila caerulea

== Wrens ==
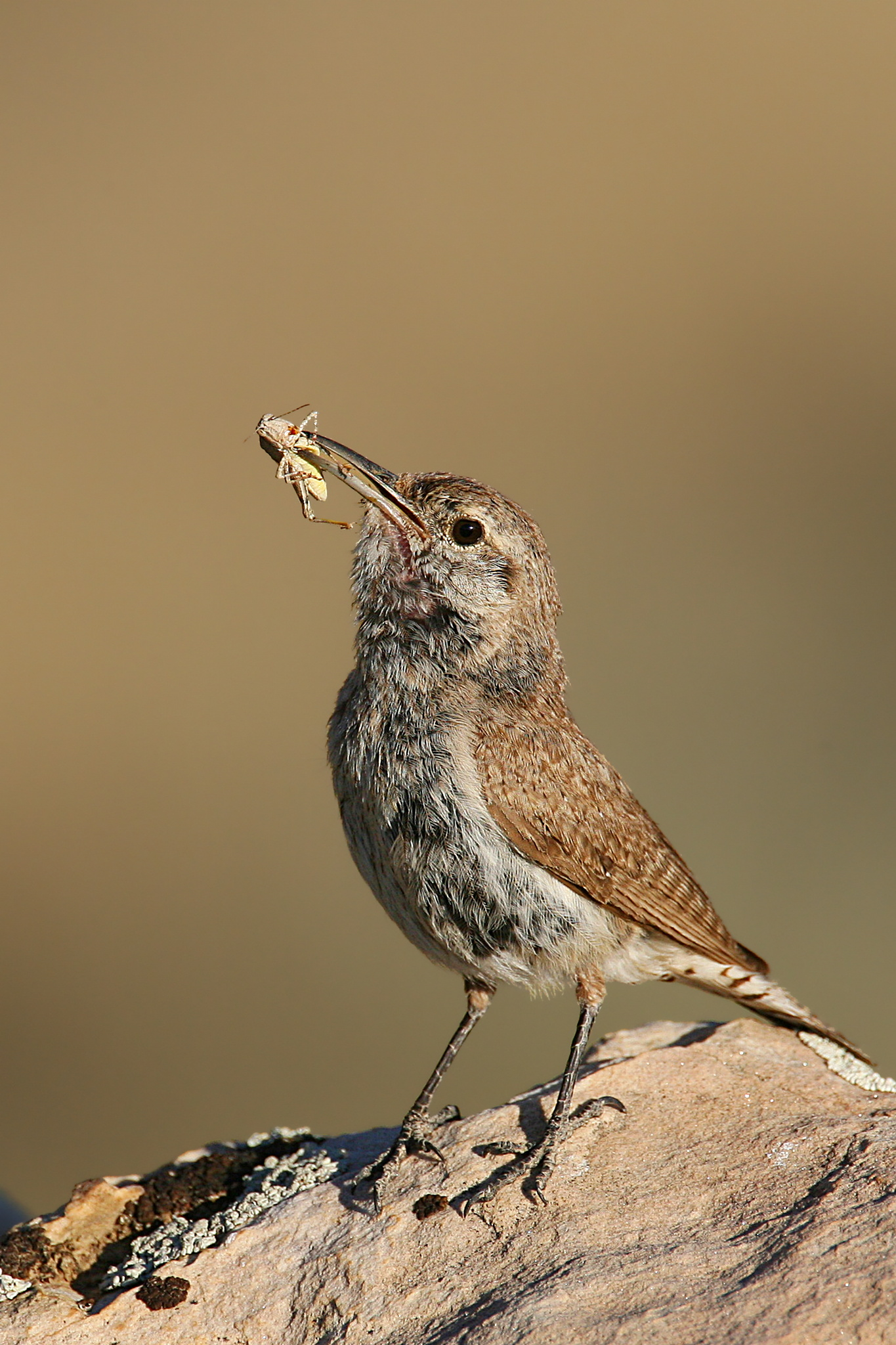
Rock wren

Order: Passeriformes Family: Troglodytidae

Wrens are small and inconspicuous birds, except for their loud songs. They have short wings and thin down-turned bills. Several species often hold their tails upright. All are insectivorous.

- Rock wren, Salpinctes obsoletus
- Canyon wren, Catherpes mexicanus
- House wren, Troglodytes aedon
- Pacific wren, Troglodytes pacificus
- Winter wren, Troglodytes hiemalis (R)
- Sedge wren, Cistothorus platensis (R)
- Marsh wren, Cistothorus palustris
- Bewick's wren, Thryomanes bewickii

== Mockingbirds and thrashers ==
Order: Passeriformes Family: Mimidae

The mimids are a family of passerine birds which includes thrashers, mockingbirds, tremblers, and the New World catbirds. These birds are notable for their vocalization, especially their remarkable ability to mimic a wide variety of birds and other sounds heard outdoors. The species tend towards dull grays and browns in their appearance.

- Gray catbird, Dumetella carolinensis
- Curve-billed thrasher, Toxostoma curvirostre (R) (P)
- Brown thrasher, Toxostoma rufum
- California thrasher, Toxostoma redivivum (R)
- Sage thrasher, Oreoscoptes montanus
- Northern mockingbird, Mimus polyglottos

== Starlings ==
Order: Passeriformes Family: Sturnidae

Starlings are small to medium-sized Old World passerine birds with strong feet. Their flight is strong and direct and most are very gregarious. Their preferred habitat is fairly open country, and they eat insects and fruit. The plumage of several species is dark with a metallic sheen.

- European starling, Sturnus vulgaris (I)

== Dippers ==
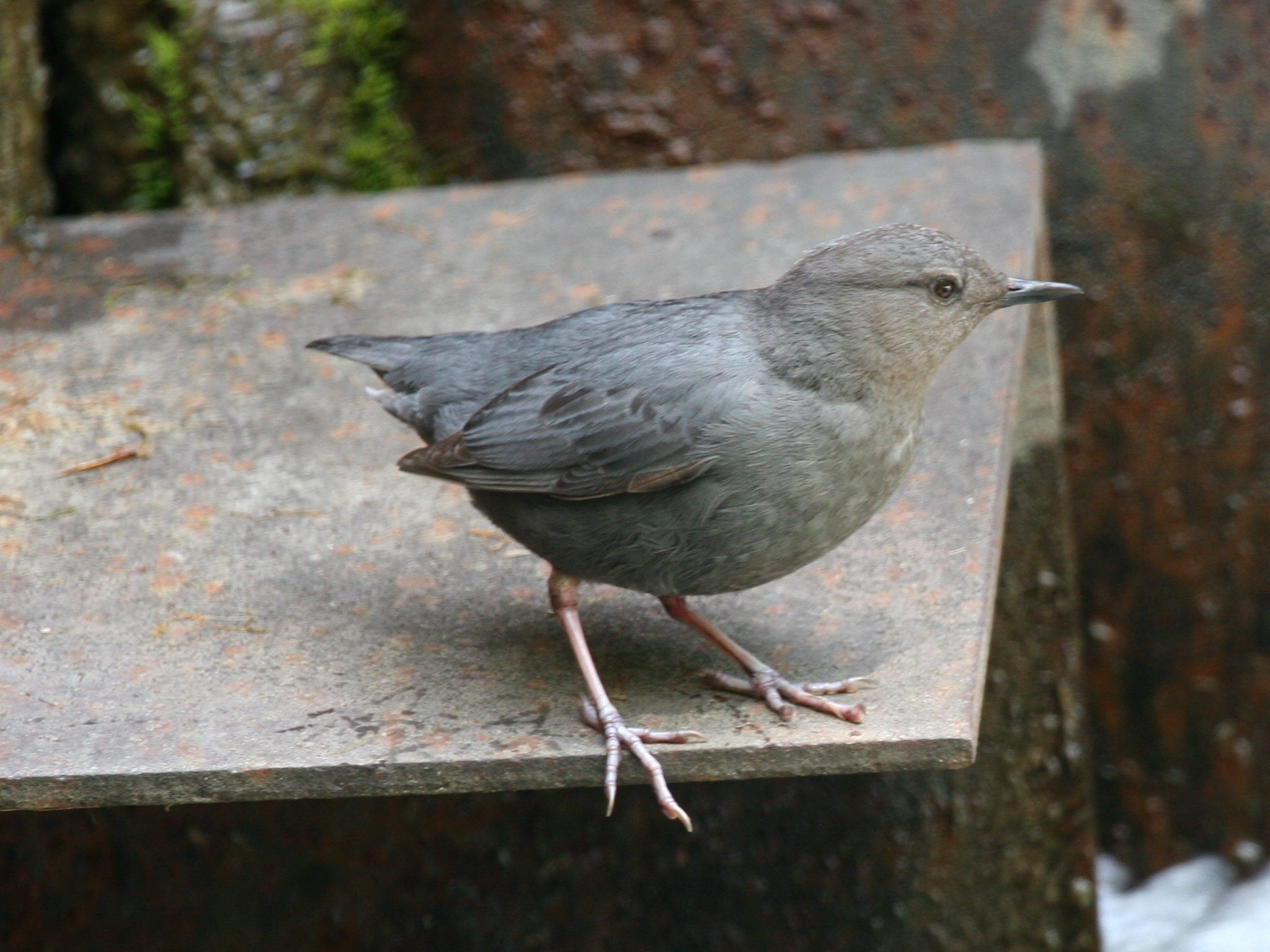
American dipper

Order: Passeriformes Family: Cinclidae

Dippers are a group of perching birds whose habitat includes aquatic environments in the Americas, Europe, and Asia. They are named for their bobbing or dipping movements. These birds have adaptations which allows them to submerge and walk on the bottom to feed on insect larvae.

- American dipper, Cinclus mexicanus

== Thrushes and allies ==
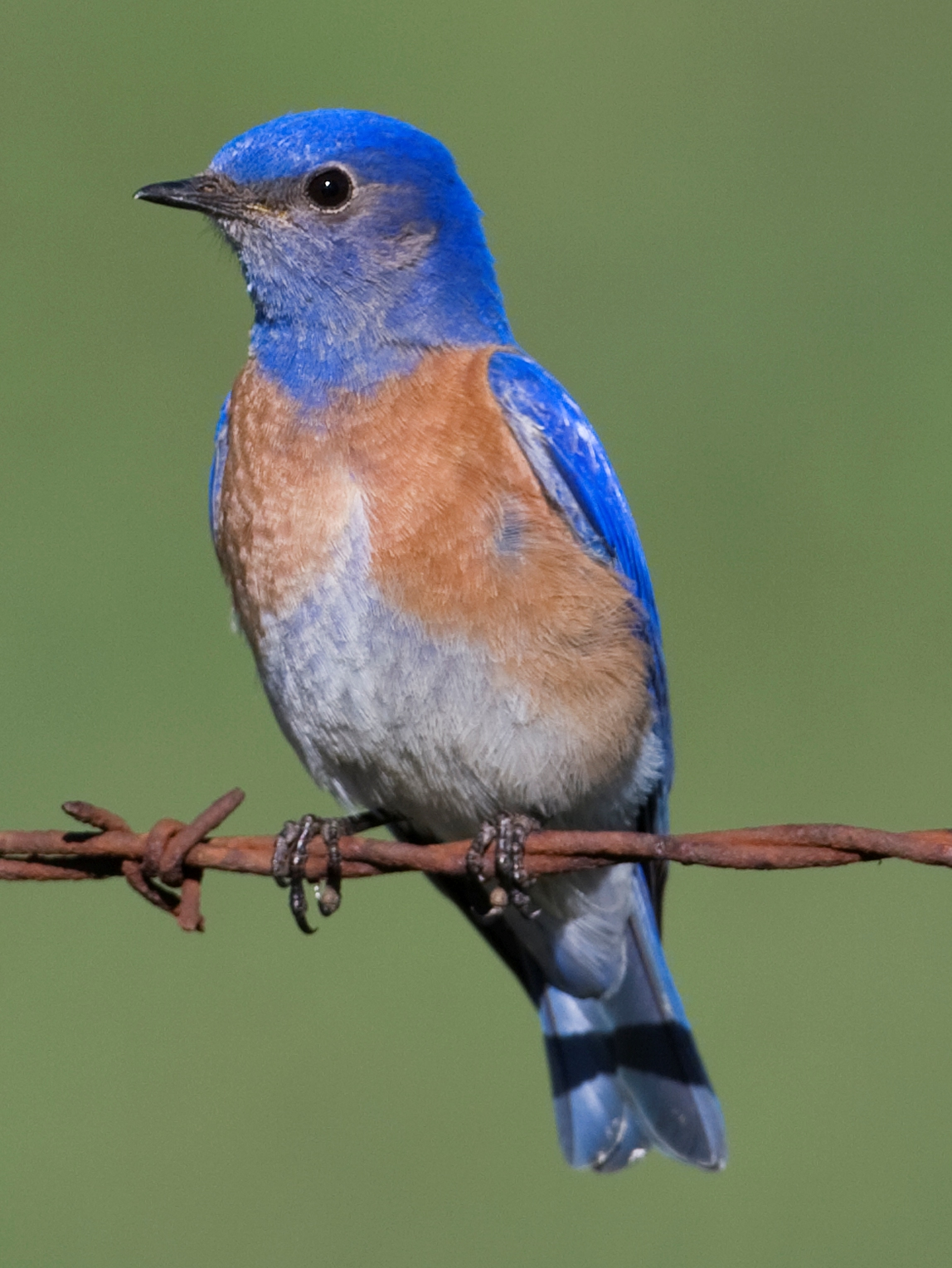
Western bluebird

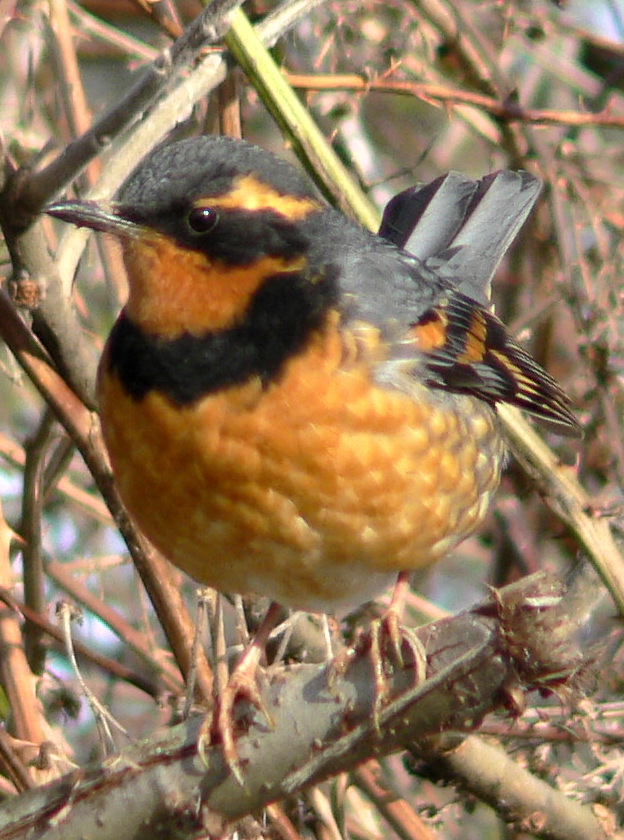
Varied thrush

Order: Passeriformes Family: Turdidae

The thrushes are a group of passerine birds that occur mainly but not exclusively in the Old World. They are plump, soft plumaged, small to medium-sized insectivores or sometimes omnivores, often feeding on the ground. Many have attractive songs.

- Eastern bluebird, Sialia sialis (R)
- Western bluebird, Sialia mexicana
- Mountain bluebird, Sialia currucoides
- Townsend's solitaire, Myadestes townsendi
- Veery, Catharus fuscescens
- Gray-cheeked thrush, Catharus minimus (R)
- Swainson's thrush, Catharus ustulatus
- Hermit thrush, Catharus guttatus
- Wood thrush, Hylocichla mustelina (R)
- Dusky thrush, Turdus naumanni (R)
- American robin, Turdus migratorius
- Varied thrush, Ixoreus naevius

== Old World flycatchers ==
Order: Passeriformes Family: Muscicapidae

The Old World flycatchers form a large family of small passerine birds. These are mainly small arboreal insectivores, many of which, as the name implies, take their prey on the wing.

- Red-flanked bluetail, Tarsiger cyanurus (R)
- Northern wheatear, Oenanthe oenanthe (R)

== Old World sparrows ==
Order: Passeriformes Family: Passeridae

Old World sparrows are small passerine birds. In general, sparrows tend to be small plump brownish or grayish birds with short tails and short powerful beaks. Sparrows are seed eaters, but they also consume small insects.

- House sparrow, Passer domesticus (I)

== Wagtails and pipits ==
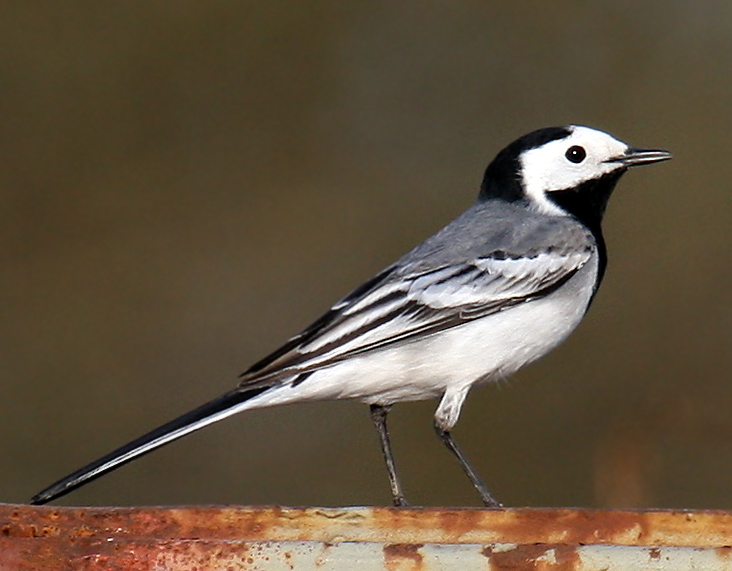
White wagtail

Order: Passeriformes Family: Motacillidae

Motacillidae is a family of small passerine birds with medium to long tails. They include the wagtails, longclaws, and pipits. They are slender ground-feeding insectivores of open country.

- Eastern yellow wagtail, Motacilla tschutschensis (R)
- White wagtail, Montacilla alba (R)
- Red-throated pipit, Anthus cervinus (R)
- American pipit, Anthus rubescens
- Sprague's pipit, Anthus spragueii (R)

== Finches, euphonias, and allies ==
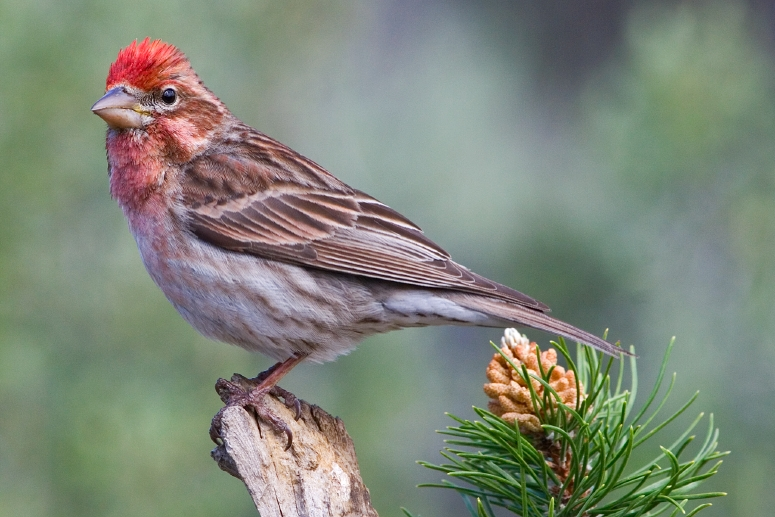
Cassin's finch

Order: Passeriformes Family: Fringillidae

Finches are seed-eating passerine birds that are small to moderately large and have a strong beak, usually conical and in some species very large. All have twelve tail feathers and nine primaries. These birds have a bouncing flight with alternating bouts of flapping and gliding on closed wings, and most sing well.

- Brambling, Fringilla montifringilla (R)
- Evening grosbeak, Coccothraustes vespertinus
- Pine grosbeak, Pinicola enucleator
- Gray-crowned rosy-finch, Leucosticte tephrocotis
- Black rosy-finch, Leucosticte atrata
- House finch, Haemorhous mexicanus
- Purple finch, Haemorhous purpureus
- Cassin's finch, Haemorhous cassinii
- Oriental greenfinch, Chloris sinica (R)
- Common redpoll, Acanthis flammea
- Hoary redpoll, Acanthis hornemanni (R)
- Red crossbill, Loxia curvirostra
- White-winged crossbill, Loxia leucoptera
- Pine siskin, Spinus pinus
- Lesser goldfinch, Spinus psaltria
- Lawrence's goldfinch, Spinus lawrencei (R)
- American goldfinch, Spinus tristis

== Longspurs and snow buntings ==
Order: Passeriformes Family: Calcariidae

The Calcariidae are a group of passerine birds that had been traditionally grouped with the New World sparrows, but differ in a number of respects and are usually found in open grassy areas.

- Lapland longspur, Calcarius lapponicus
- Chestnut-collared longspur, Calcarius ornatus
- Smith's longspur, Calcarius pictus (R)
- Thick-billed longspur, Rhynchophanes mccownii (R)
- Snow bunting, Plectrophenax nivalis
- McKay's bunting, Plectrophenax hyperboreus (R)

== Old World buntings ==
Order: Passeriformes Family: Emberizidae

Emberizidae is a family of passerine birds containing a single genus. Until 2017, the New World sparrows (Passerellidae) were also considered part of this family.

- Little bunting, Emberiza pusilla (R)
- Rustic bunting, Emberiza rustica (R)

== New World sparrows ==
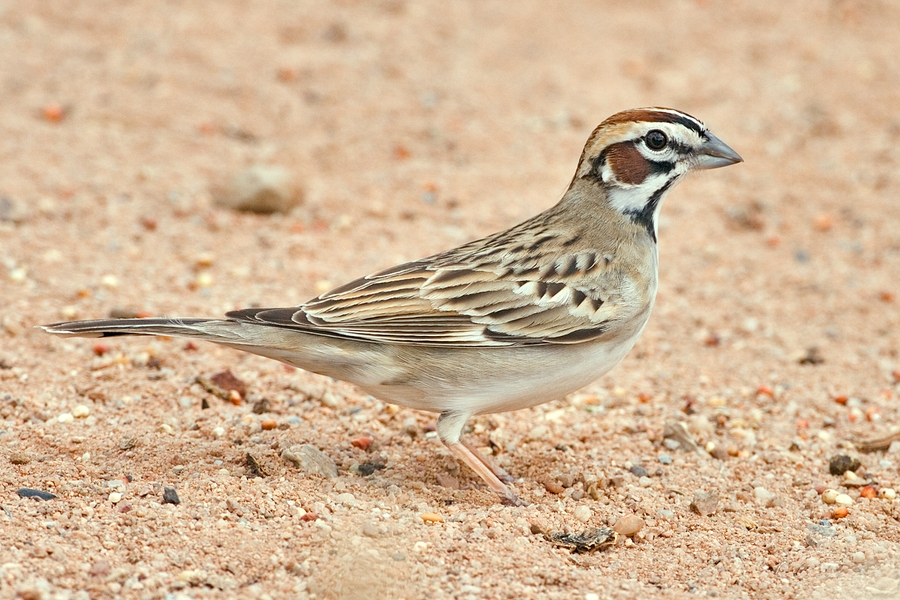
Lark sparrow

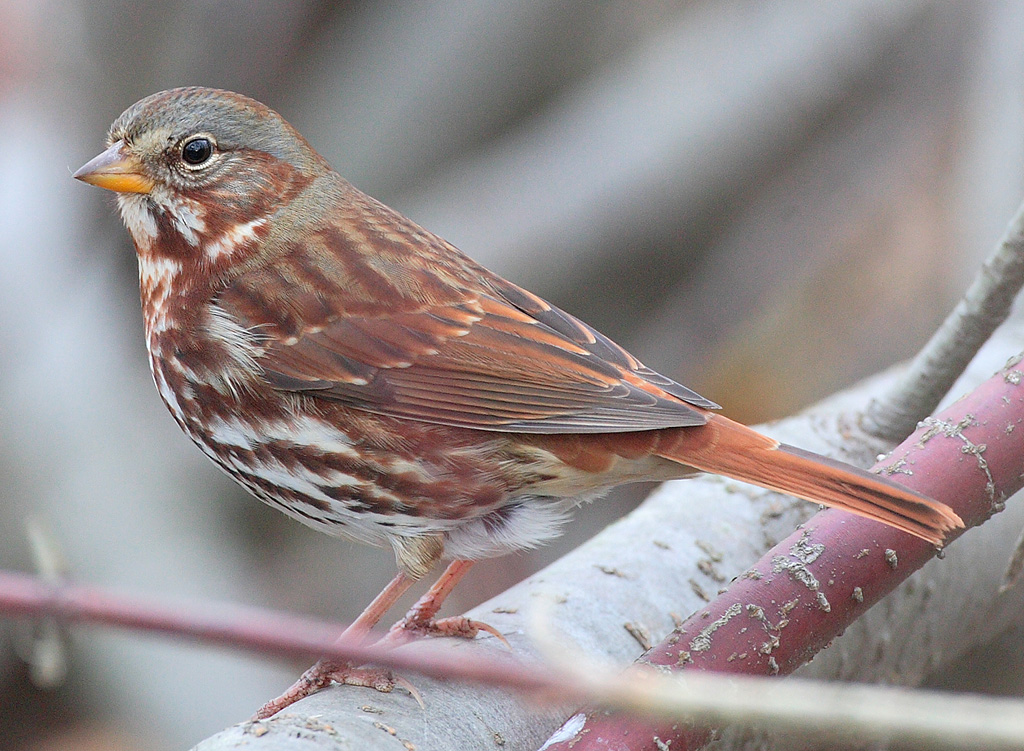
Fox sparrow

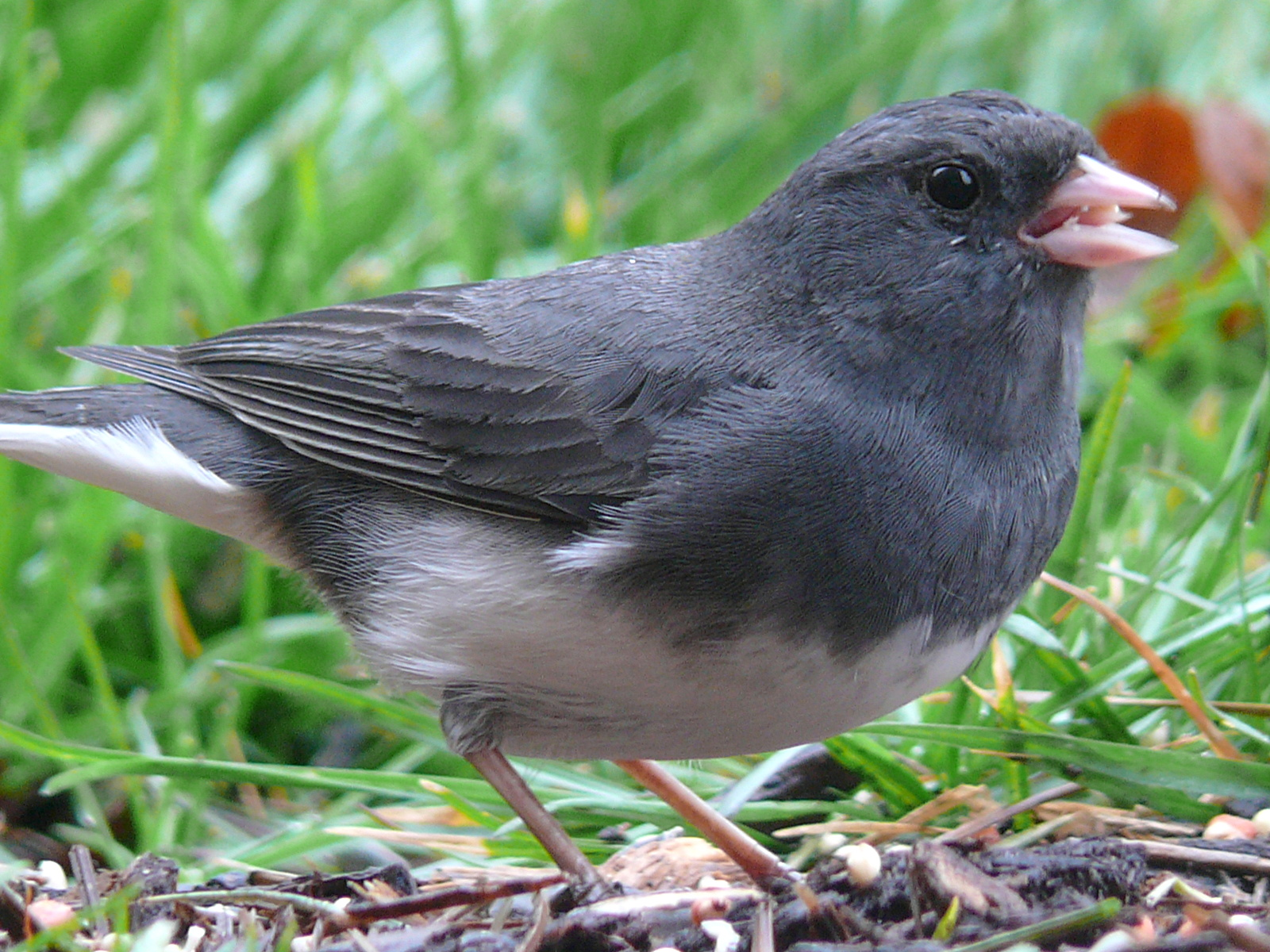
Dark-eyed junco

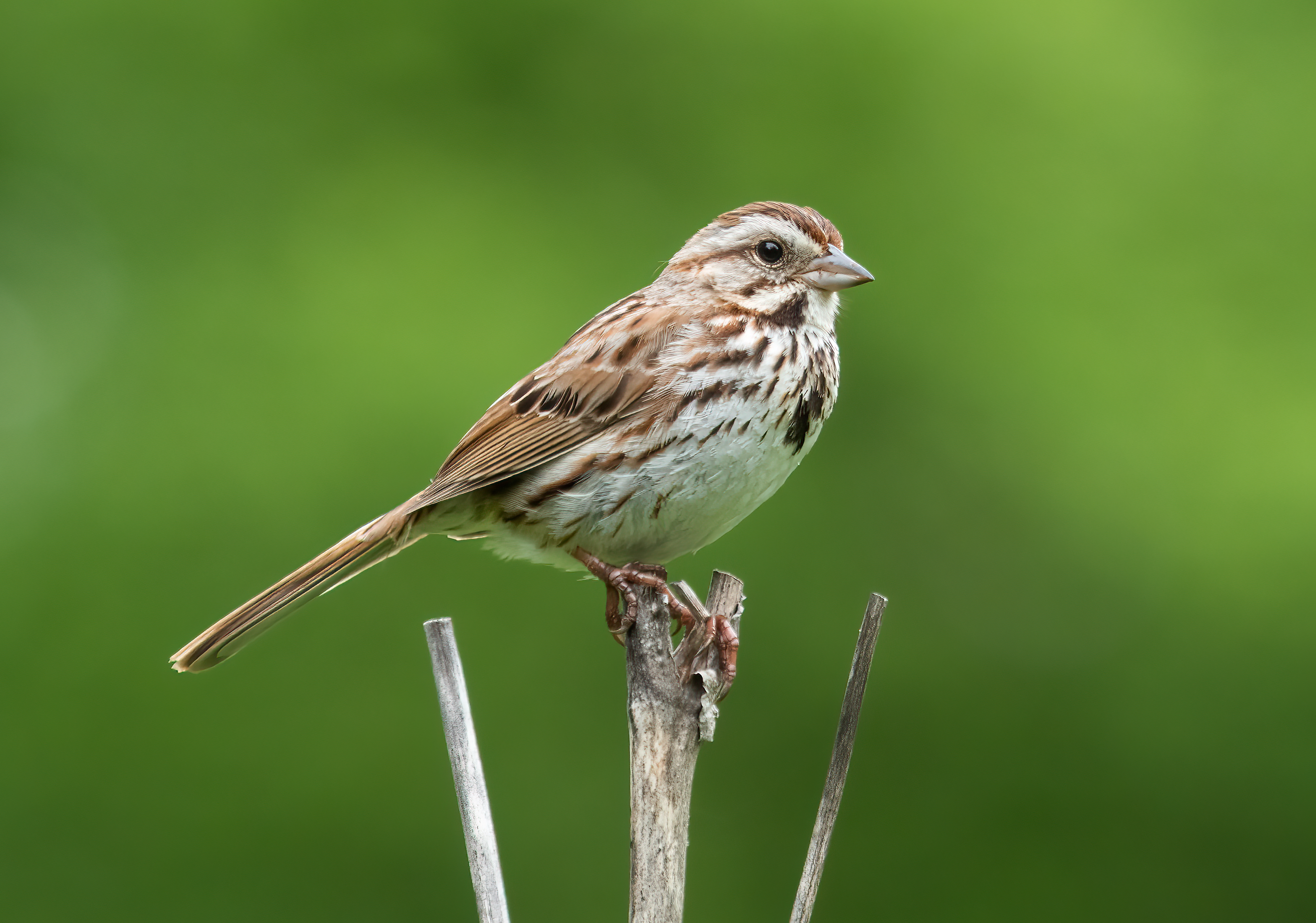
Song sparrow

Order: Passeriformes Family: Passerellidae

Until 2017, these species were considered part of the family Emberizidae. Most of the species are known as sparrows, but these birds are not closely related to the Old World sparrows which are in the family Passeridae. Many of these have distinctive head patterns.

- Cassin's sparrow, Peucaea cassinii (R)
- Grasshopper sparrow, Ammodramus savannarum
- Black-throated sparrow, Amphispiza bilineata
- Lark sparrow, Chondestes grammacus
- Lark bunting, Calamospiza melanocorys
- Chipping sparrow, Spizella passerina
- Clay-colored sparrow, Spizella pallida
- Black-chinned sparrow, Spizella atrogularis (R)
- Brewer's sparrow, Spizella breweri
- Fox sparrow, Passerella iliaca
- American tree sparrow, Spizelloides arborea
- Dark-eyed junco, Junco hyemalis
- White-crowned sparrow, Zonotrichia leucophrys
- Golden-crowned sparrow, Zonotrichia atricapilla
- Harris's sparrow, Zonotrichia querula
- White-throated sparrow, Zonotrichia albicollis
- Sagebrush sparrow, Artemisiospiza nevadensis
- Vesper sparrow, Pooecetes gramineus
- LeConte's sparrow, Ammospiza leconteii (R)
- Savannah sparrow, Passerculus sandwichensis
- Song sparrow, Melospiza melodia
- Lincoln's sparrow, Melospiza lincolnii
- Swamp sparrow, Melospiza georgiana
- California towhee, Melozone crissalis
- Green-tailed towhee, Pipilo chlorurus
- Spotted towhee, Pipilo maculatus
- Eastern towhee, Pipilo erythrophthalmus (R)

== Yellow-breasted chat ==
Order: Passeriformes Family: Icteriidae

This species was historically placed in the wood-warblers (Parulidae) but nonetheless most authorities were unsure if it belonged there. It was placed in its own family in 2017

- Yellow-breasted chat, Icteria virens

== Troupials and allies ==
Order: Passeriformes Family: Icteridae

The icterids are a group of small to medium-sized, often colorful passerine birds restricted to the New World and include the grackles, New World blackbirds, and New World orioles. Most species have black as a predominant plumage color, often enlivened by yellow, orange, or red.

- Yellow-headed blackbird, Xanthocephalus xanthocephalus
- Bobolink, Dolichonyx oryzivorus
- Western meadowlark, Sturnella neglecta
- Orchard oriole, Icterus spurius (R)
- Hooded oriole, Icterus cucullatus
- Streak-backed oriole, Icterus pustulatus (R)
- Bullock's oriole, Icterus bullockii
- Baltimore oriole, Icterus galbula (R)
- Scott's oriole, Icterus parisorum (R)
- Red-winged blackbird, Agelaius phoeniceus
- Tricolored blackbird, Agelaius tricolor
- Brown-headed cowbird, Molothrus ater
- Rusty blackbird, Euphagus carolinus
- Brewer's blackbird, Euphagus cyanocephalus
- Common grackle, Quiscalus quiscula (R)
- Great-tailed grackle, Quiscalus mexicanus

== New World warblers ==
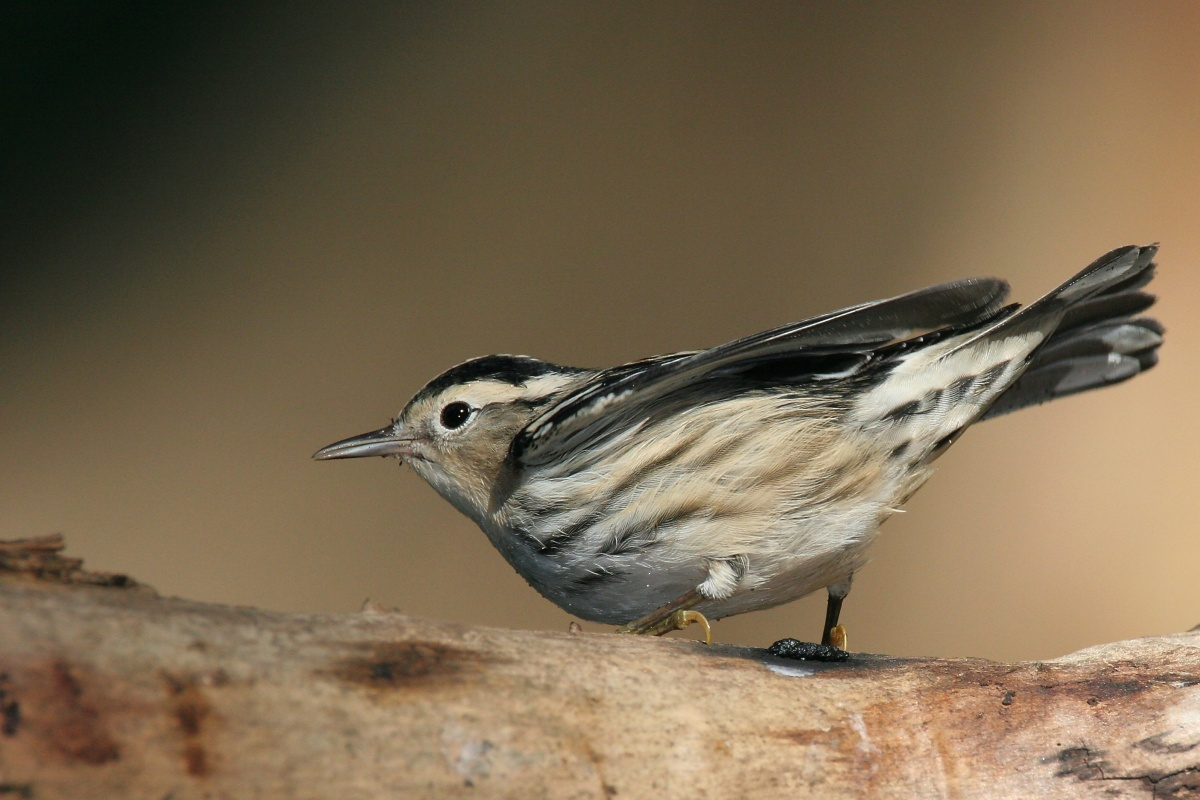
Black-and-white warbler

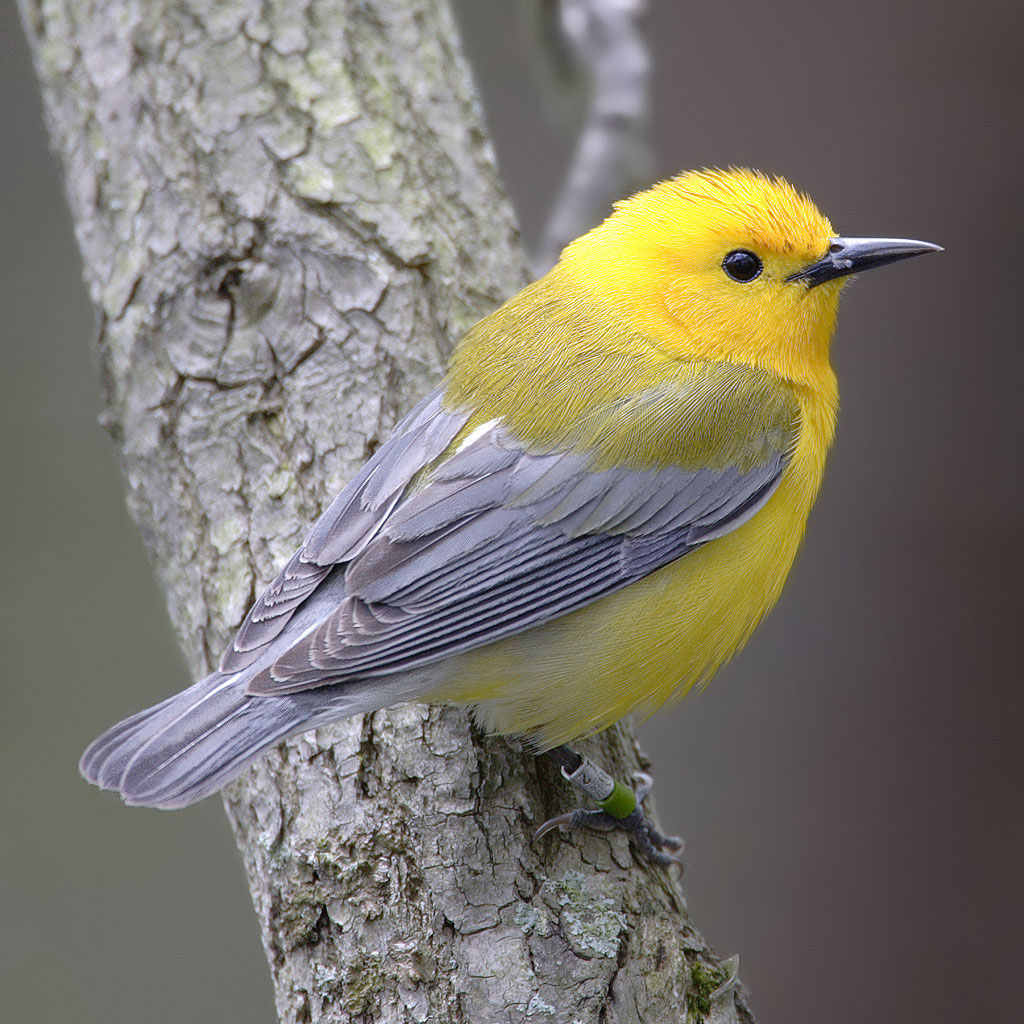
Prothonotary warbler

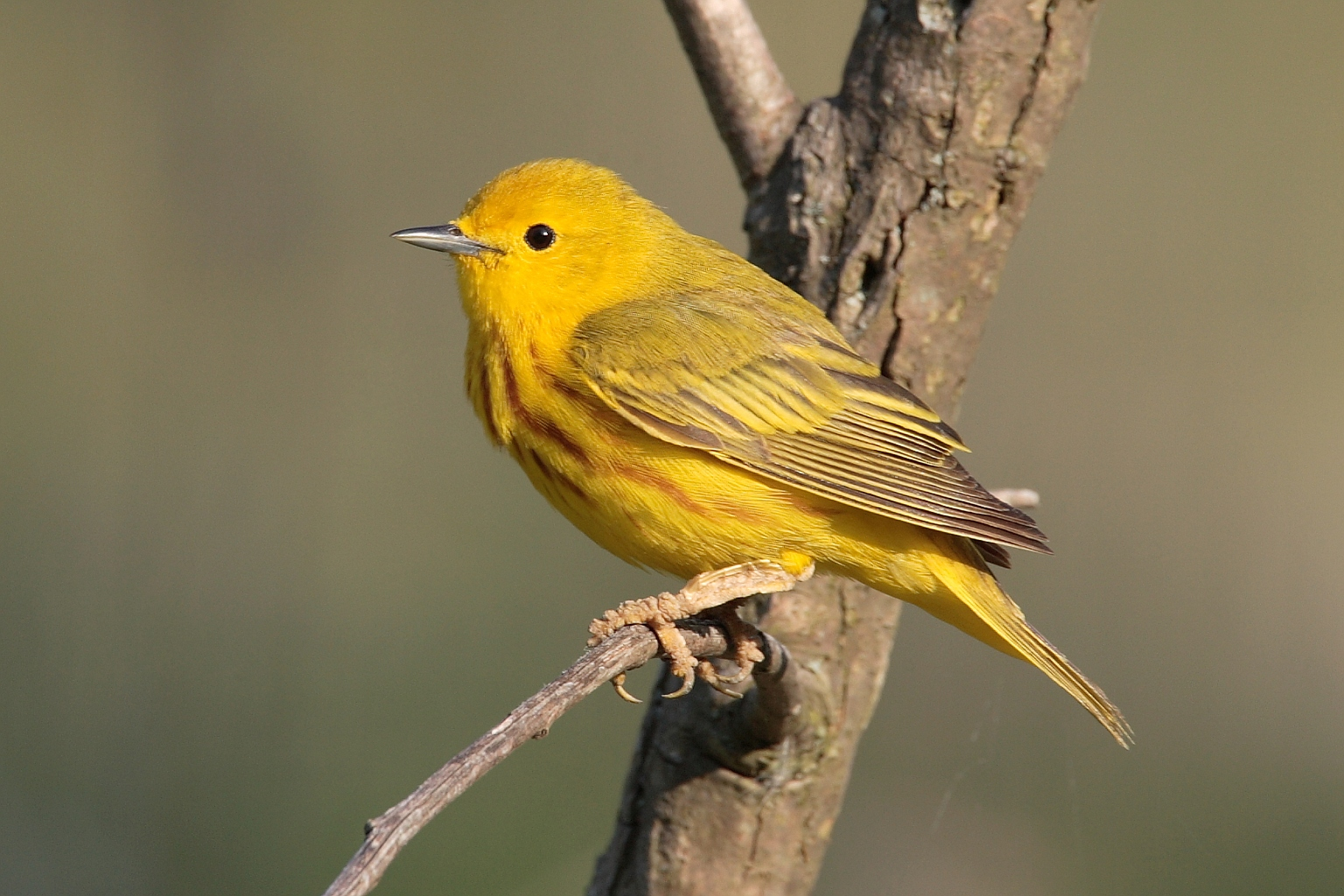
Yellow warbler

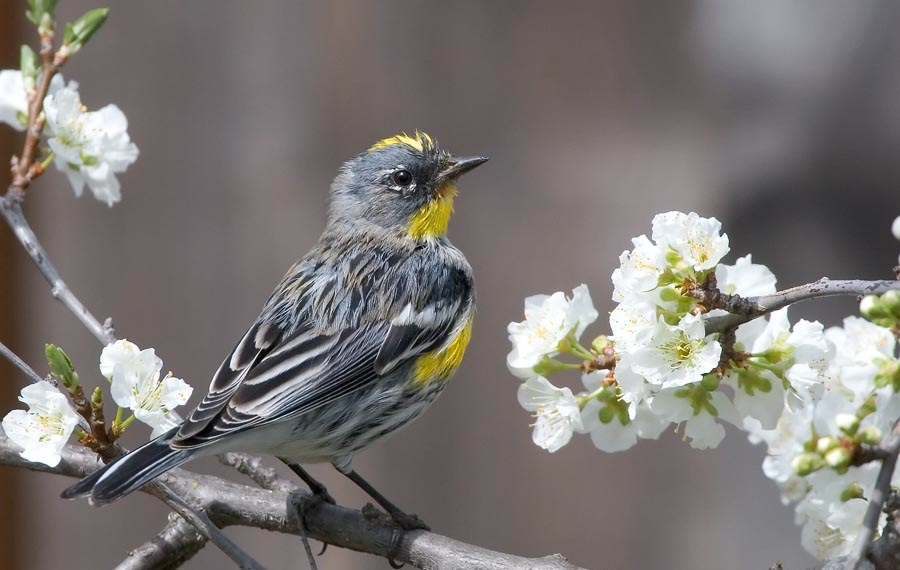
Yellow-rumped warbler

Order: Passeriformes Family: Parulidae

The wood warblers are a group of small and often colorful passerine birds restricted to the New World. Most are arboreal, but some are more terrestrial. Most members of this family are insectivores.

- Ovenbird, Seiurus aurocapilla
- Worm-eating warbler, Helmitheros vermivorum (R) (P)
- Louisiana waterthrush, Parkesia motacilla (R)
- Northern waterthrush, Parkesia noveboracensis
- Golden-winged warbler, Vermivora chrysoptera (R)
- Blue-winged warbler, Vermivora cyanoptera (R)
- Black-and-white warbler, Mniotilta varia
- Prothonotary warbler, Protonotaria citrea (R)
- Tennessee warbler, Leiothlypis peregrina
- Orange-crowned warbler, Leiothlypis celata
- Lucy's warbler, Leiothlypis luciae (R)
- Nashville warbler, Leiothlypis ruficapilla
- Virginia's warbler, Leiothlypis virginiae (R)
- MacGillivray's warbler, Geothlypis tolmiei
- Mourning warbler, Geothlypis philadelphia (R)
- Kentucky warbler, Geothlypis formosa (R)
- Common yellowthroat, Geothlypis trichas
- Hooded warbler, Setophaga citrina (R)
- American redstart, Setophaga ruticilla
- Cape May warbler, Setophaga tigrina (R)
- Northern parula, Setophaga americana
- Magnolia warbler, Setophaga magnolia
- Bay-breasted warbler, Setophaga castanea (R)
- Blackburnian warbler, Setophaga fusca (R)
- Yellow warbler, Setophaga petechia
- Chestnut-sided warbler, Setophaga pensylvanica
- Blackpoll warbler, Setophaga striata
- Black-throated blue warbler, Setophaga caerulescens
- Palm warbler, Setophaga palmarum
- Pine warbler, Setophaga pinus (R)
- Yellow-rumped warbler, Setophaga coronata
- Yellow-throated warbler, Setophaga dominica (R)
- Prairie warbler, Setophaga discolor (R)
- Black-throated gray warbler, Setophaga nigrescens
- Townsend's warbler, Setophaga townsendi
- Hermit warbler, Setophaga occidentalis
- Black-throated green warbler, Setophaga virens (R)
- Canada warbler, Cardellina canadensis (R)
- Wilson's warbler, Cardellina pusilla
- Painted redstart, Myioborus pictus (R) (P)

== Cardinals and allies ==
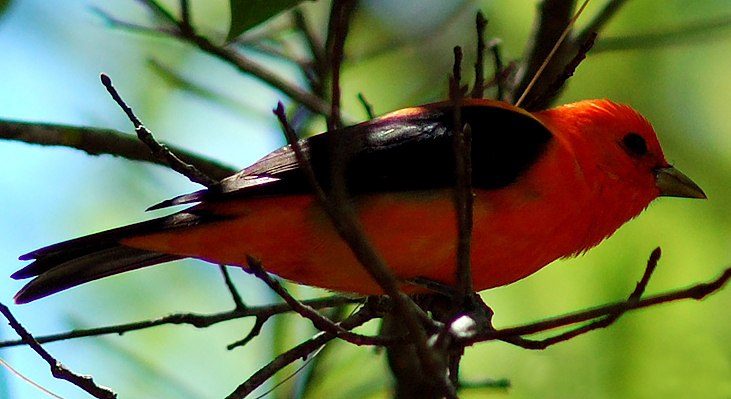
Scarlet tanager

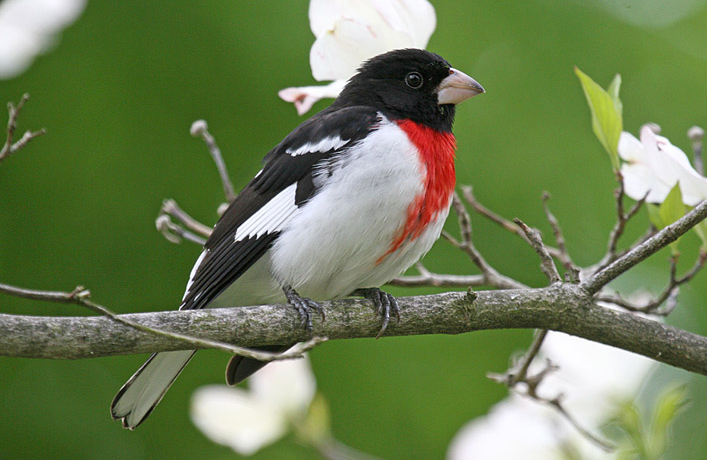
Rose-breasted grosbeak

Order: Passeriformes Family: Cardinalidae

The cardinals are a family of robust seed-eating birds with strong bills. They are typically associated with open woodland. The sexes usually have distinct plumages.

- Summer tanager, Piranga rubra (R)
- Scarlet tanager, Piranga olivacea (R)
- Western tanager, Piranga ludoviciana
- Pyrrhuloxia, Cardinalis sinuatus (R)
- Rose-breasted grosbeak, Pheucticus ludovicianus
- Black-headed grosbeak, Pheucticus melanocephalus
- Blue grosbeak, Passerina caerulea (R)
- Lazuli bunting, Passerina amoena
- Indigo bunting, Passerina cyanea
- Painted bunting, Passerina ciris (R)
- Dickcissel, Spiza americana (R)

== See also ==
- Bird Alliance of Oregon
- Crows in Portland, Oregon
- List of amphibians and reptiles of Oregon
- List of birds of the Klamath Basin
- List of native Oregon plants
- Lists of Oregon-related topics
