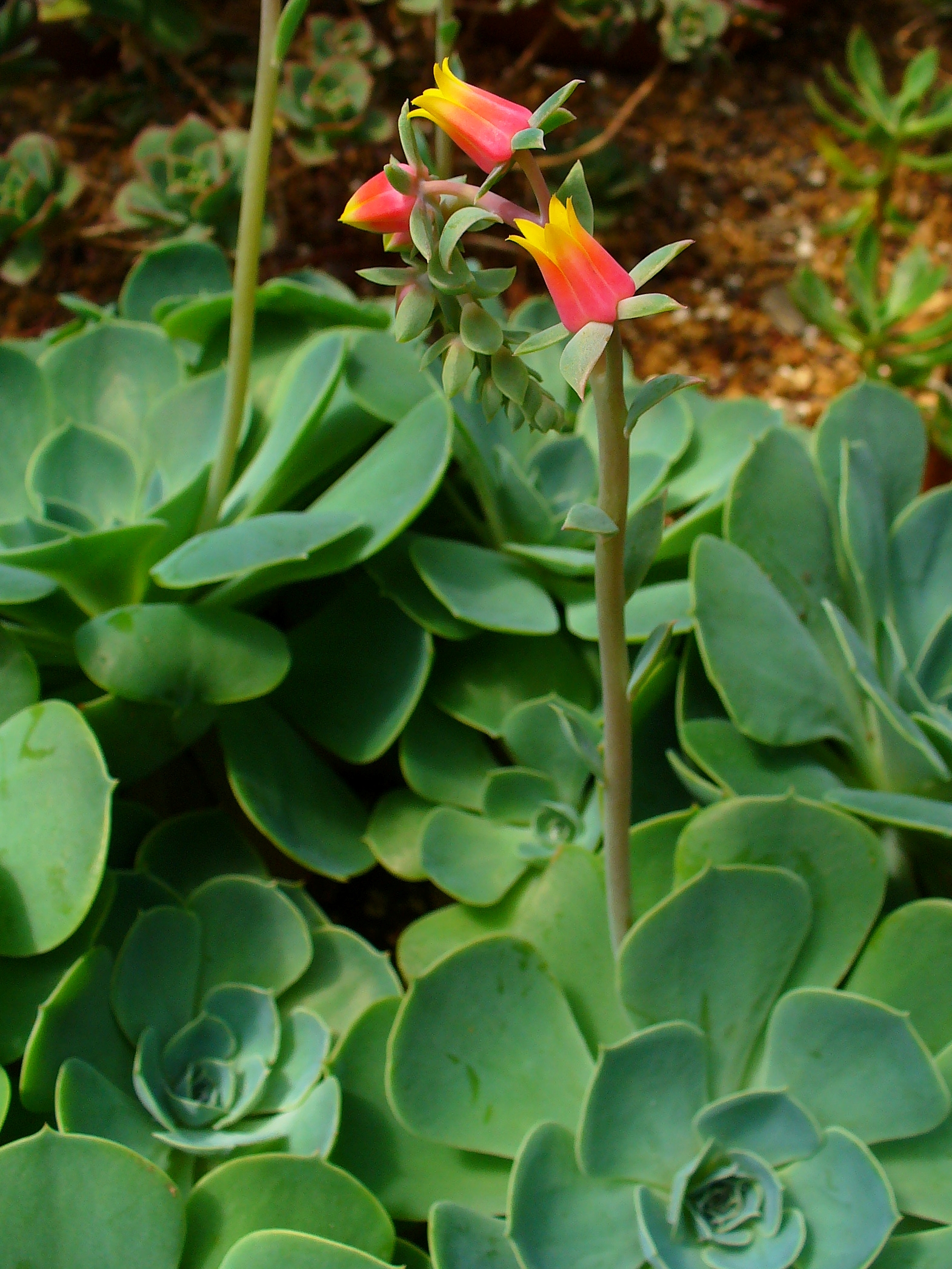

Scientific classification
- Kingdom: Plantae
- Clade: Tracheophytes
- Clade: Angiosperms
- Clade: Eudicots
- Order: Saxifragales
- Family: Crassulaceae
- Genus: Echeveria
- Species: E. gibbiflora

Binomial name
- Echeveria gibbiflora DC.

Synonyms
- Cotyledon gibbiflora (DC) Baker (1869); Echeveria grandifolia Haworth (1828); Echeveria campanulata Kunze (1843)

= Echeveria gibbiflora =

Species of succulent

Echeveria gibbiflora is a species of flowering plant in the family Crassulaceae. It was described by Swiss botanist Augustin Pyramus de Candolle in 1828. It occurs in Mexico and Guatemala.

== Description ==
Echeveria gibbiflora is a large species of Echeveria, producing rosettes of 15 leaves, a tall flowering stem up to 1 metre (3 ft 3 in) in height, and an average of 160 flower buds. The red, tubular flowers are about 2.5 centimetres (0.98 in) long with 10 stamens and 5 styles. It flowers between September and January. The dry fruits each produce approximately 200 small seeds.

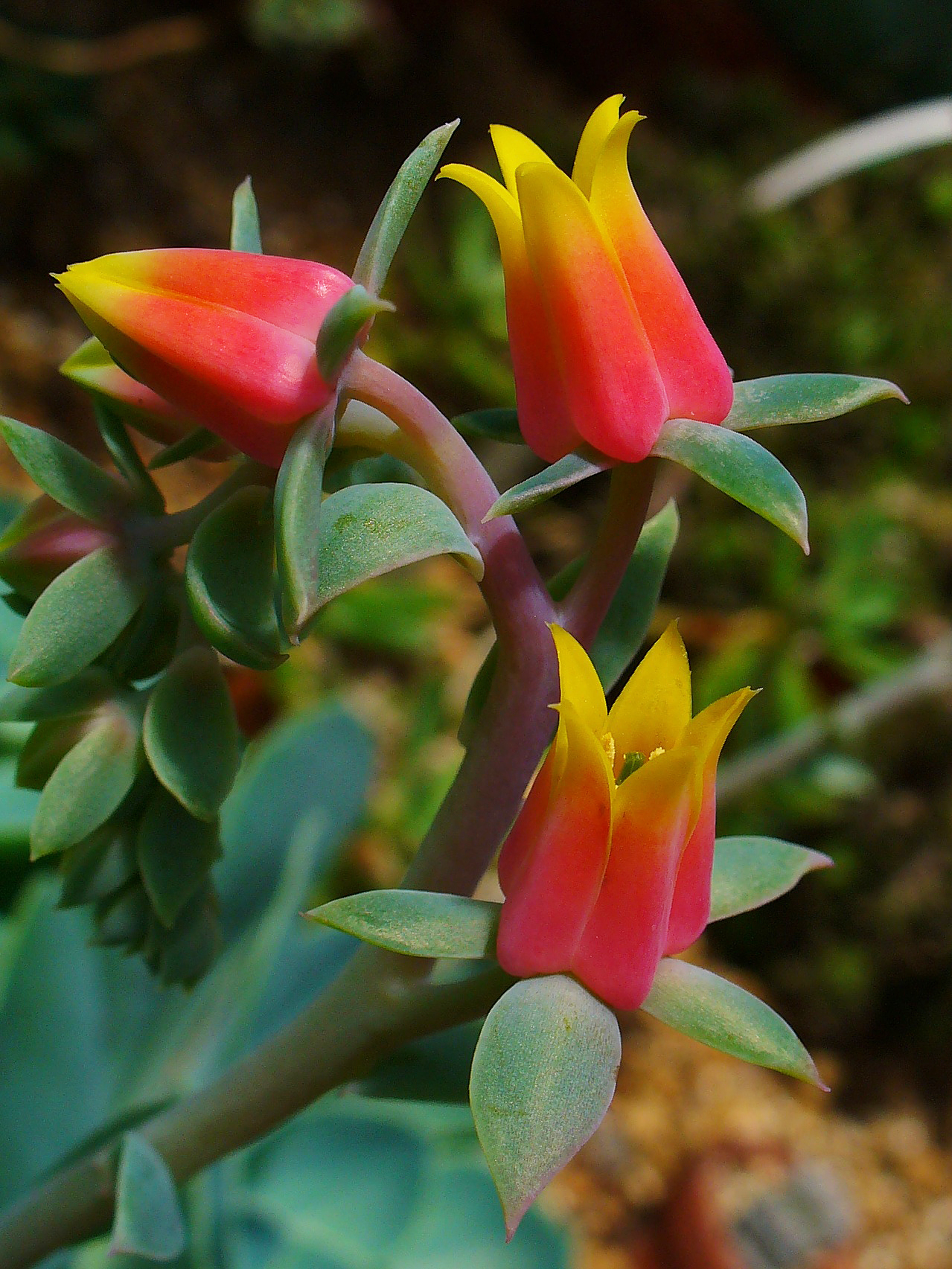
Flowers

== Ecology ==
Each flower is open for between 7–8 days and is visited by nectar-seeking broad-billed hummingbirds (Cynanthus latirostris). The American bushtit (Psaltriparus minimus) has been documented foraging for aphids that occur among the flowers.

== Uses ==
Echeveria gibbiflora has been used in Mexican folk medicine as a contraceptive, as a vaginal postcoital rinse.

Cultivars include E. gibbiflora 'Carunculata' (also spelled 'Caronculata'), E. gibbiflora 'Metallica', and E. gibbiflora 'Violescens'.
