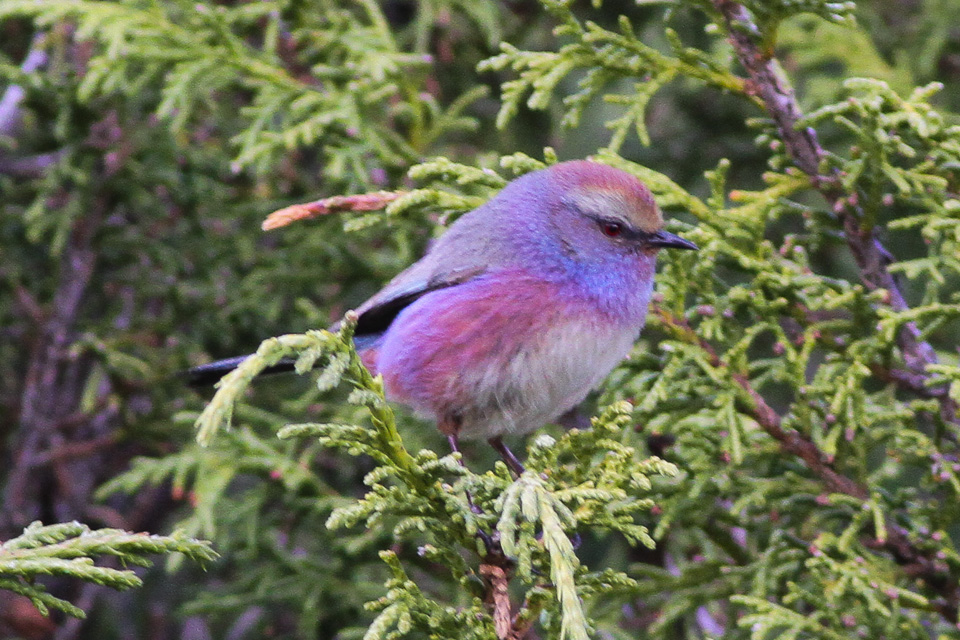
- Male of nominate subspecies
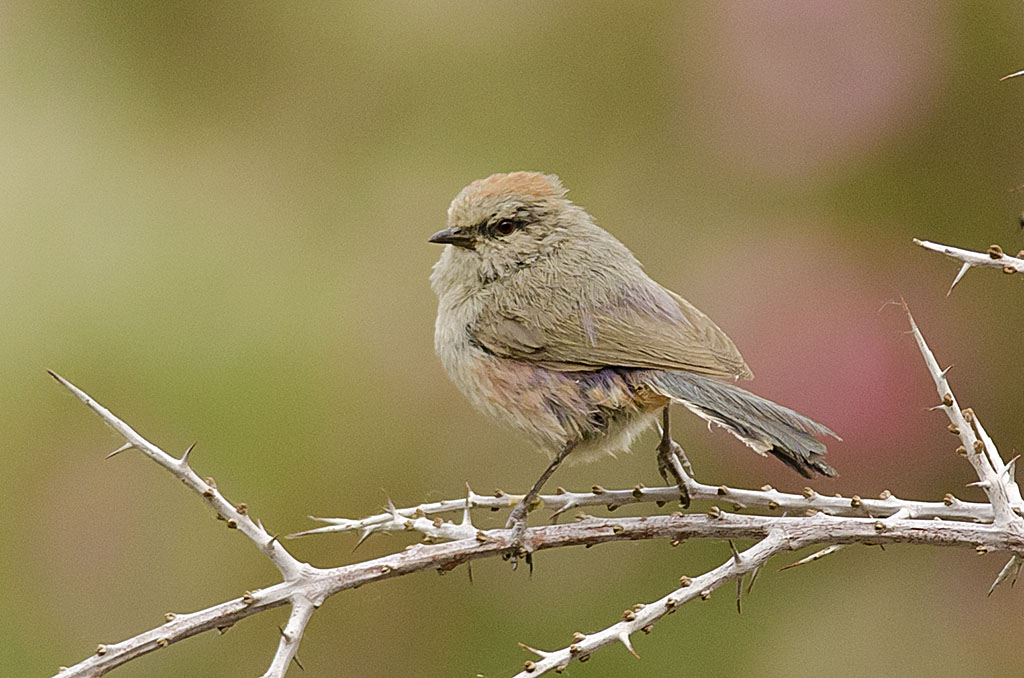
- Female of nominate subspecies

Conservation status
- Least Concern (IUCN 3.1)

Scientific classification
- Kingdom: Animalia
- Phylum: Chordata
- Class: Aves
- Order: Passeriformes
- Family: Aegithalidae
- Genus: Leptopoecile
- Species: L. sophiae

Binomial name
- Leptopoecile sophiae Severtsov, 1873
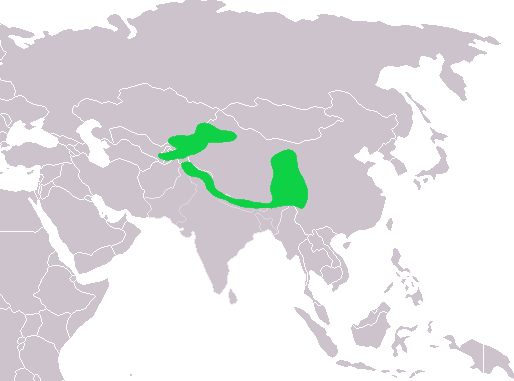
- Range in green, on a map of central Asia

= White-browed tit-warbler =

Songbird of the mountains of Tibet and China

The white-browed tit-warbler (Leptopoecile sophiae) is a species of bird in the family Aegithalidae. The species was first described by Nikolai Severtzov in 1873. It is resident in the Tian Shan and central China as well as in the Himalayas where it is mainly found in winter. Its natural habitat is boreal forests.

== Taxonomy and systematics ==
The white-browed tit warbler is a passerine bird in the bushtit family. It was first described in 1873 by Russian ornithologist Nikolai Severtzov.

The genus name, Leptopoecile, comes from Greek leptos, which means "slender" or "delicate". James A. Jobling supposed, that the specific epithet, sophiae, comes from the female eponym "Sophia"; it might refer to Sophia Maria Alexandrovna, who was tzarina of Russia during Severtzov's lifetime. It is more likely, however, that the species epithet refers to Severtsov's wife, Sofia Alexandrovna Poltoratskaya. For about a year (1865-1866) Sophia was a member of Severtsov's expedition to the Tian Shan and Issyk-Kul. She collected plants and insects and, as a talented artist, made many sketches.

Four subspecies are recognized:

- L. s. sophiae (Severtzov, 1873) – The nominate subspecies. It ranges from southeast Kazakhstan to northwest China, as well as northwest India and north Pakistan.
- L. s. stoliczkae (Hume, 1874) – It is found in China in south Xinjiang, west Qinghai and extreme west Xizang provinces. It has the lightest plumage of the subspecies, and its buff underparts are more extensive. This subspecies is named for Ferdinand Stoliczka, the Czech zoologist.
- L. s. major (Menzbier, 1885) – Found in west Xinjiang and north Qinghai province in China. It has lighter plumage than the nominate race and is relatively drab, but still darker than L. s. stoliczkae. Found at lower altitudes in heavy forest. Major means "great" in Latin.
- L. s. obscurus (Przewalski, 1887) – Present in central Nepal, south and southeast Xizang and south and east Qinghai to south Gansu and Sichuan provinces in China. It is found at higher elevations within the range, preferring moist mountain scrub habitats. Its plumage is darker than the nominate race, with a more rufous crown. Interbreeding with the nominate race occurs where their range overlaps in Qinghai and Gansu provinces. Obscurus means "dark" or "dusky" in Latin.

The exact range boundaries of the subspecies are not well known. The nominate race and L. s. obscurus form a similar group distinguished by their dark coloration and high altitude homes, whereas L. s. major and L. s. stoliczkae form a group distinguished by light coloration and lower altitude range. Since they inhabit different biomes in each group, and are somewhat distinct from the other, it has been proposed that they may actually be two different species.

== Description ==
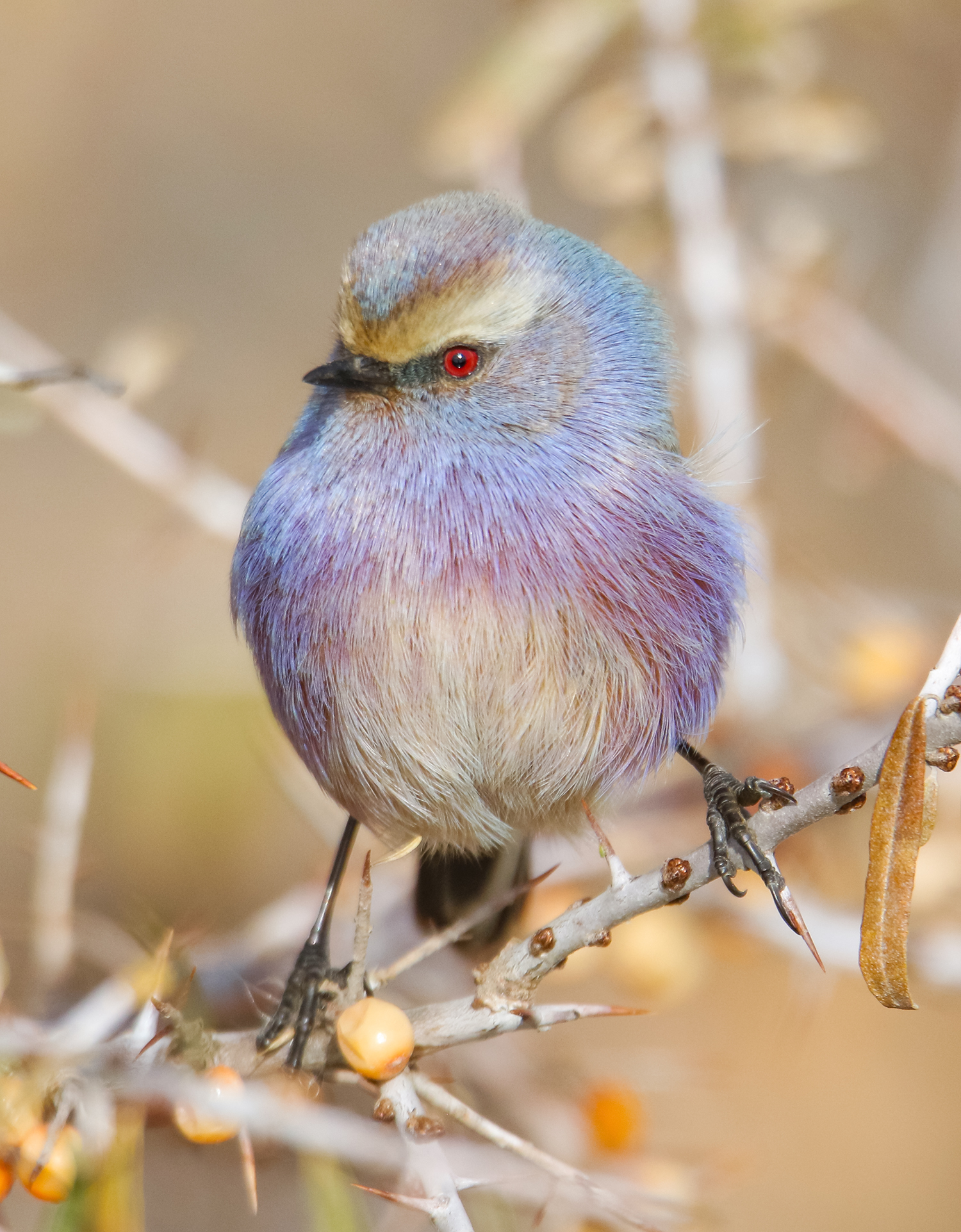
Male, showing colorful plumage

These birds are small, weighing 6–8 g (0.21–0.28 oz) and are 8.5–10 cm (3.3–3.9 in) long. The males are vibrantly colored, with distinctive blue-mauve underparts. Both males and females have a light brown crown and white supercilium (eyebrow). The rump and upper tail-coverts are violet blue. Females are generally duller, and can be distinguished by their pale underparts, whereas the males have violet-blue underparts and chest. The tail is relatively long.

== Distribution and habitat ==
The white-browed tit-warbler prefers dry mountainous shrubland between 2,000–5,000 m (6,600–16,400 ft). It ranges in the Himalayas, the Tibetan Plateau, and much of Northwest China. They tend to disperse to lower elevations during the winter. A 2016 paper determined that they belonged to a "Middle-mountainous forest steppe community" within the Tian Shan mountain range. A study within Karakoram National Park found that they were uncommon residents, and that there was a winter influx of population.

== Behavior and ecology ==
White-browed tit-warblers generally live in pairs during the breeding season, but will join flocks of 25 or more individuals at the end of the season. During winter these flocks may become multi-species.

=== Breeding and nesting ===
A study in the mountains of Tibet found that the white-browed tit-warbler begins breeding before any other local songbird, generally starting in early April and running through July. Breeding is delayed as elevation increases. Pairs are monogamous, with males and females sharing nesting duties. Nests are dome-shaped and placed in shrubs about 0.9 m (3.0 ft) off the ground. Both sexes build nests over a period of two weeks. Four to six whitish eggs with red-brown spots on the tips are laid, although up to nine may be laid. Eggs average 1.14 g (0.040 oz) in mass and average 15.6 mm × 11.6 mm (0.61 in × 0.46 in) in dimension. Incubation lasts around 20.5 days. An average of 4.3 eggs hatch, but only 3.8 survive to fledging – which occurs around 17.5 days old. Broods raised late in the season tended to have higher ratios of females. When the nestlings hatch they are naked and do not open their eyes until they are approximately 7 days old. At this time their sex is identifiable.

The Tibetan study noted some unusual behavior, such as two females attending a single nest, which means that the species may practice cooperative breeding. This finding is backed up by the discovery of egg dumping, in which a female laid her entire clutch in another's nest, and not as a form of brood parasitism. Cooperative nesting remains rare, however, occurring in less than 1% of nests, compared to 50% in the related black-throated bushtit.

=== Feeding ===
Their diet consists chiefly of small insects and spiders, which are caught mainly on the ground. They are vigorous foragers, and search under roots and rocks. Some insects may be taken aerially, however. The diet is supplemented by a small amount of seeds and berries in the colder months. Chicks are fed solely insect matter.

=== Survival ===
Predation accounts for a relatively low rate of nest failure: only 34% compared to an average of 80% for birds in similar habitats. This may be enabled by their well camouflaged nests, or simply the lack of local predators. Despite living in a very cold climate, they lack an arteria ophthalmica externa, a specialized blood vessel. In many cold adapted birds, this blood vessel is routed through the skull such that it minimizes heat loss. This adaptation helped songbirds to colonize cold climates, but the white-browed tit-warbler's lack of the trait points to other methods of surviving their cold environment.

== Status ==
The Tibetan study found a significant decline in nests between 2005 and 2007, but was uncertain what had caused such a steep loss.
