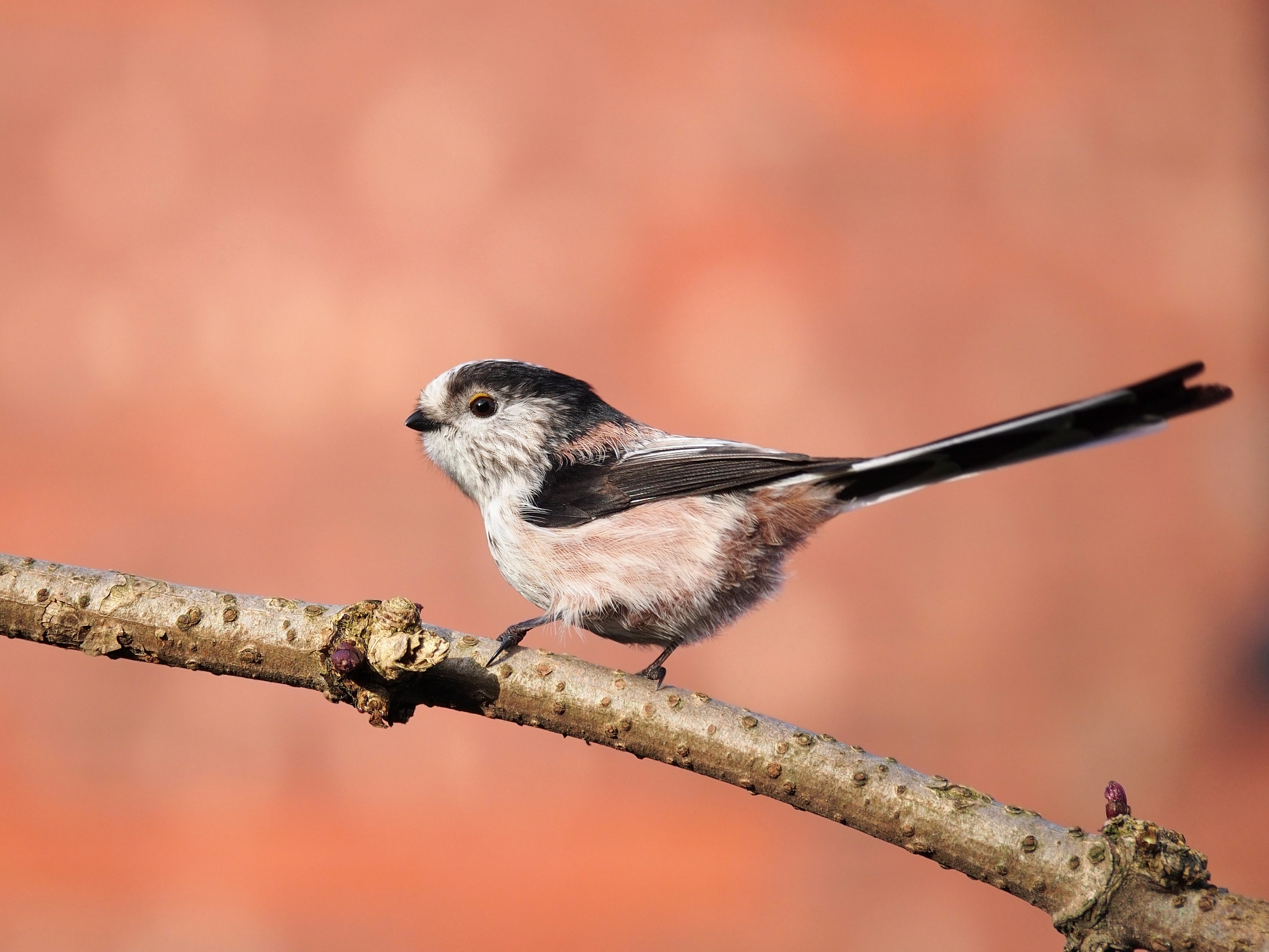
- Long-tailed tit Aegithalos caudatus

Scientific classification
- Kingdom: Animalia
- Phylum: Chordata
- Class: Aves
- Order: Passeriformes
- Superfamily: Aegithaloidea
- Family: Aegithalidae; Reichenbach, 1850

Genera
- Aegithalos Hermann 1804; Psaltriparus Townsend, 1837; Leptopoecile Severtsov, 1873

Audio
- Song of the American bushtit, Psaltriparus minimus

= Aegithalidae =

Family of birds

The bushtits or long-tailed tits are small passerine birds from the family Aegithalidae, containing 13 species in three genera, all but one of which (Psaltriparus) are found in Eurasia. Bushtits are active birds with long tails compared to their size, moving almost constantly while they forage for insects in shrubs and trees. During non-breeding season, birds live in flocks of up to 50 individuals. Several bushtit species display cooperative breeding behavior, also called helpers at the nest.

== Distribution and habitat ==
All the Aegithalidae are forest birds, particularly forest edge and understory habitats. The species in the genus Aegithalos prefer deciduous or mixed deciduous forests, while the Indonesian pygmy bushtit is found mostly in montane coniferous forest. Bushtits are found in a wide range of habitats, including on occasion sagebrush steppe and other arid shrublands, but are most common in mixed woodland. Most species in this family live in mountainous habitats in and around the Himalayas, and all are found in Eurasia except the American bushtit, which is native to western North America. The long-tailed tit has the most widespread distribution of any species of Aegithalidae, occurring across Eurasia from Britain to Japan. Two species, in contrast, have tiny distributions, the Burmese bushtit, which is entirely restricted to two mountains in Burma, and the pygmy bushtit, which is restricted to the mountains of western Java. The species in this family are generally not migratory, although the long-tailed tit is prone to dispersing in the northern edges of its range (particularly in Siberia). Many mountainous species move to lower ground during the winter.

== Description ==
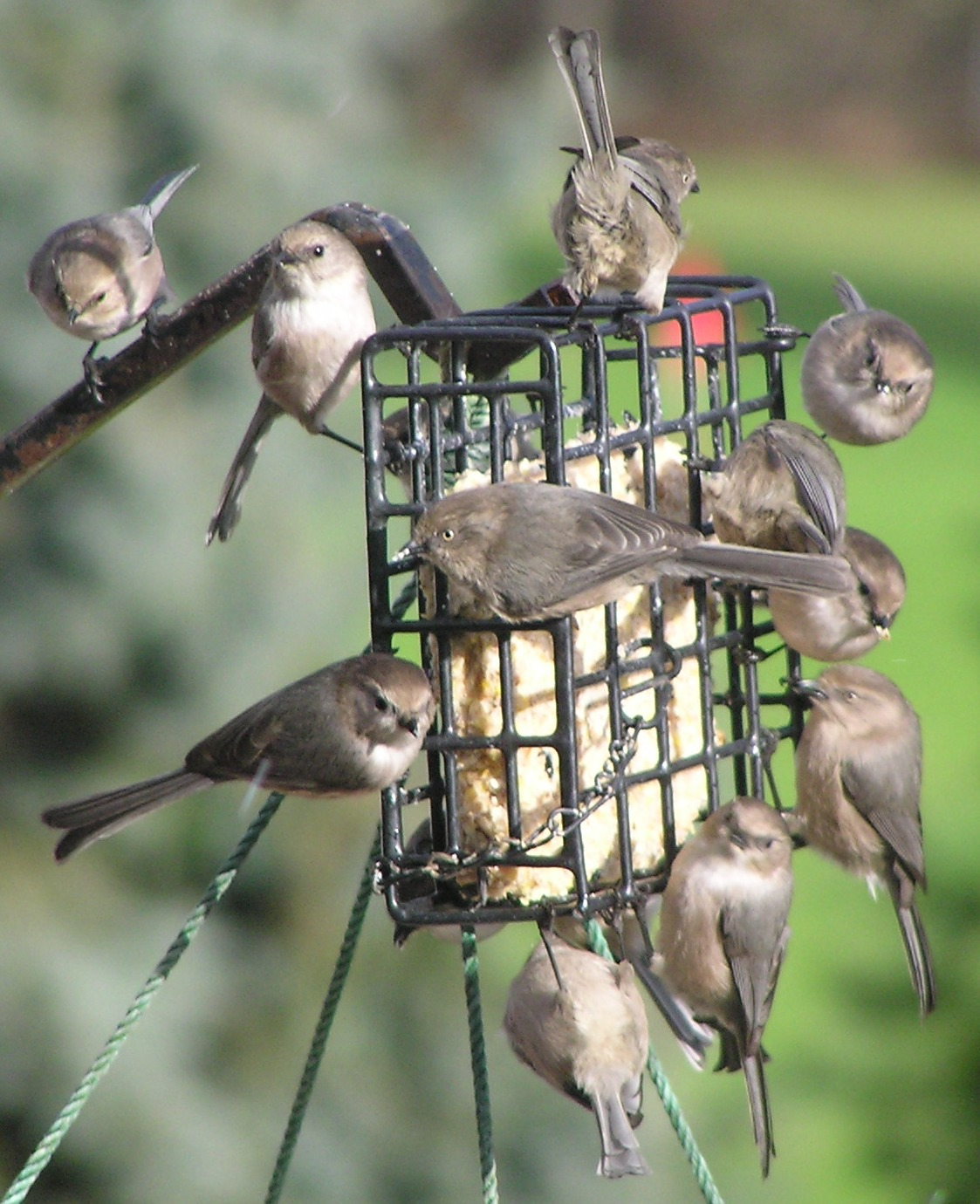
In the non-breeding season American bushtit pairs join into large flocks

They are small birds, measuring 9 to 14 cm (3.5–5.5 in) in length, including the relatively long tail, and weighing just 4.5 to 9 g (0.16–0.32 oz). Their plumage is typically dull grey or brown, although some species have white markings and the long-tailed tit has some pinkish colour. In contrast to the rest of the family the two Leptopoecile tit-warblers are quite brightly coloured, having violet and blue plumage. The crested tit-warbler is the only member of the family to have a crest. The bills in this family are tiny, short and conical in shape. The wings are short and rounded and the legs are relatively long.

== Behaviour ==
Birds in this family live in flocks ranging from 4 to over 50 individuals. Flocks form as soon as one breeding season finishes and last until the next one begins. They maintain contact by contact calls that vary among species; their songs are quiet or nonexistent. Other species of birds, such as tits or warblers, will occasionally join the flock to forage.

=== Diet and feeding ===
Bushtits are insectivorous, primarily eating insects and other invertebrates such as leafhoppers, treehoppers, aphids, scale insects, and caterpillars. Plant material, such as berries or seeds, is taken occasionally during the winter. The family generally forages arboreally, usually in the shrub layer or canopy, and seldom visits the ground. Prey is generally gleaned from branches, leaves and buds. Less frequently, prey is taken in the air. While foraging, this agile family may hang upside down on branches (although this behaviour is not thought to occur in the tit-warblers) and even manipulate branches and leaves in order to locate hidden food.

=== Breeding ===
The family generally has a monogamous breeding system; however, there is some evidence that the American bushtit may be frequently polyandrous and occasionally polygynandrous or polygynous. Pairs may be aided by helpers, where a related or unrelated individual (or more than one) helps the established pair raise the young. This has been recorded in at least four of the species; further research is required to see if the behavior carries over to other members of the family. Aegithalids make domed or hanging, bag-like nests of woven cobwebs and lichen, which they line with feathers. Many nests are constructed in trees with thick foliage, making them difficult for predators to find. However, the American bushtit often places nests such that it is entirely exposed. The clutch comprises 5 to 10 white eggs, which in many of the species have red speckles. Adults incubate the eggs for 13 to 14 days; young stay in the nest for 16 to 18 days. In at least four of the species (the long-tailed tit, the black-throated bushtit, and silver-throated bushtit), only the female incubates. Young chicks are fed exclusively on insects and spiders.

== Taxonomy ==
- - Aegithaloidea
    - - Phylloscopidae – leaf warblers (80 species)
      - - Hyliidae – hylias (2 species)
        - - Aegithalidae – bushtits (12 species)
          - - Erythrocercidae – flycatchers (3 species)
            - - Scotocercidae – streaked scrub warbler
              - Cettiidae – bush warblers and allies (32 species)

Cladogram showing the family relationships based on a study by Carl Oliveros and colleagues published in 2019. The number of species is taken from the bird list maintained by Frank Gill, Pamela Rasmussen and David Donsker on behalf of the International Ornithological Committee (IOC).

The family Aegithalidae (as a subfamily Aegithalinae) was introduced by the German naturalist Ludwig Reichenbach in 1850. The name comes from the Ancient Greek word aigithalos for a tit. Aristotle recognised three species: the long-tailed tit, the great tit, and the Eurasian blue tit.

The pygmy bushtit is placed in this family because it moves around in flocks and its nests resemble the long-tailed tits', but information about it is so scanty that the placement is only provisional. The Burmese bushtit is sometimes treated as conspecific with the black-browed bushtit. The American bushtit was once thought to belong to the chickadee family, but it has distinctive behavioral habits, especially when it comes to nesting.

There are 12 species in 3 genera.

Image	Genus	Living species
	Leptopoecile Severtzov, 1873	White-browed tit-warbler, Leptopoecile sophiae; Crested tit-warbler, Leptopoecile elegans
	Psaltriparus Bonaparte, 1850	American bushtit, Psaltriparus minimus
	Aegithalos Hermann, 1804	Long-tailed tit, Aegithalos caudatus; Silver-throated bushtit, Aegithalos glaucogularis; White-cheeked bushtit, Aegithalos leucogenys; Black-throated bushtit, Aegithalos concinnus; White-throated bushtit, Aegithalos niveogularis; Rufous-fronted bushtit, Aegithalos iouschistos; Black-browed bushtit, Aegithalos bonvaloti; Sooty bushtit, Aegithalos fuliginosus; Pygmy bushtit, Aegithalos exilis
