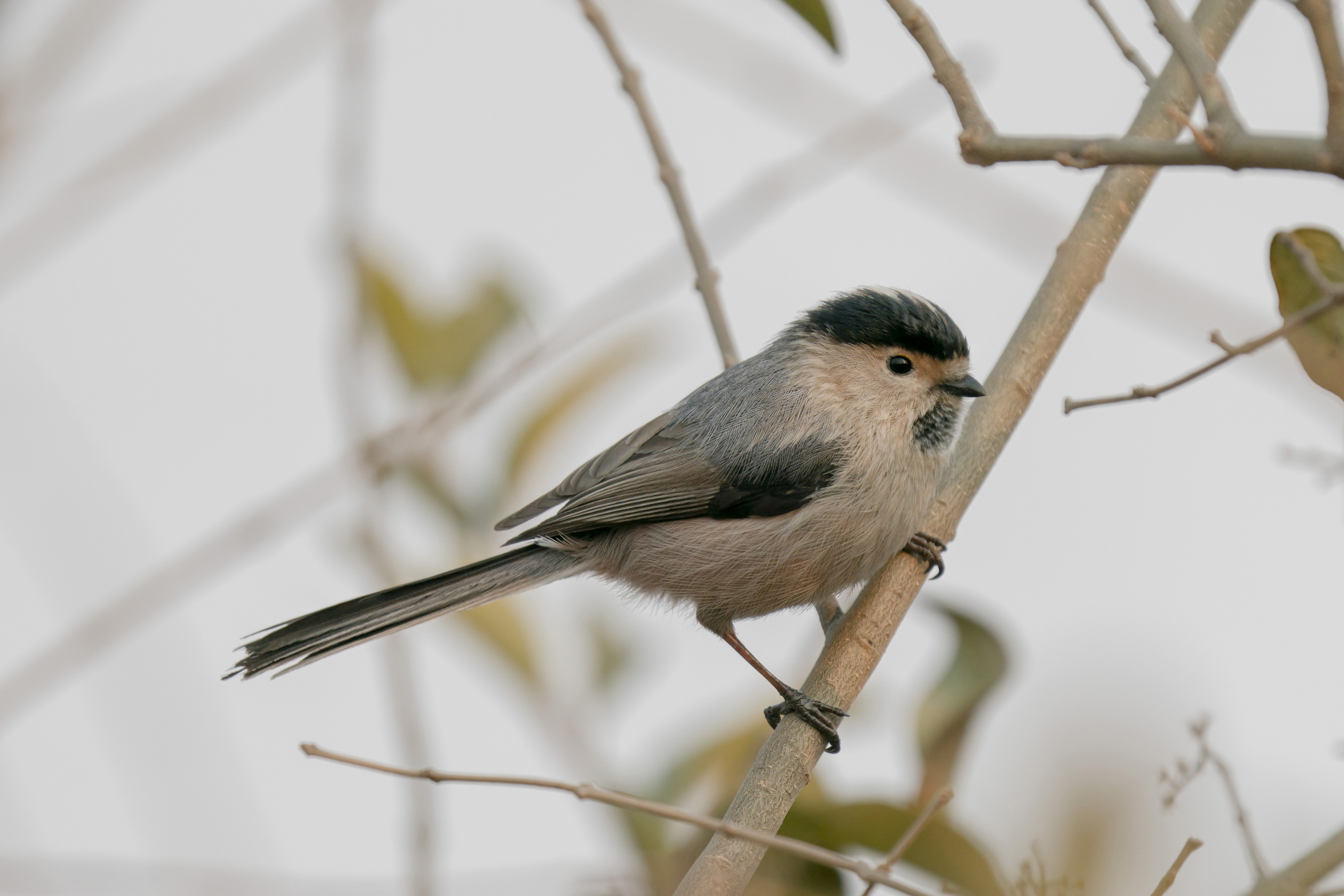
- A. g. vinaceus, Weifang, Shandong Province, China.

Conservation status
- Least Concern (IUCN 3.1)

Scientific classification
- Kingdom: Animalia
- Phylum: Chordata
- Class: Aves
- Order: Passeriformes
- Family: Aegithalidae
- Genus: Aegithalos
- Species: A. glaucogularis

Binomial name
- Aegithalos glaucogularis (Gould, 1855)
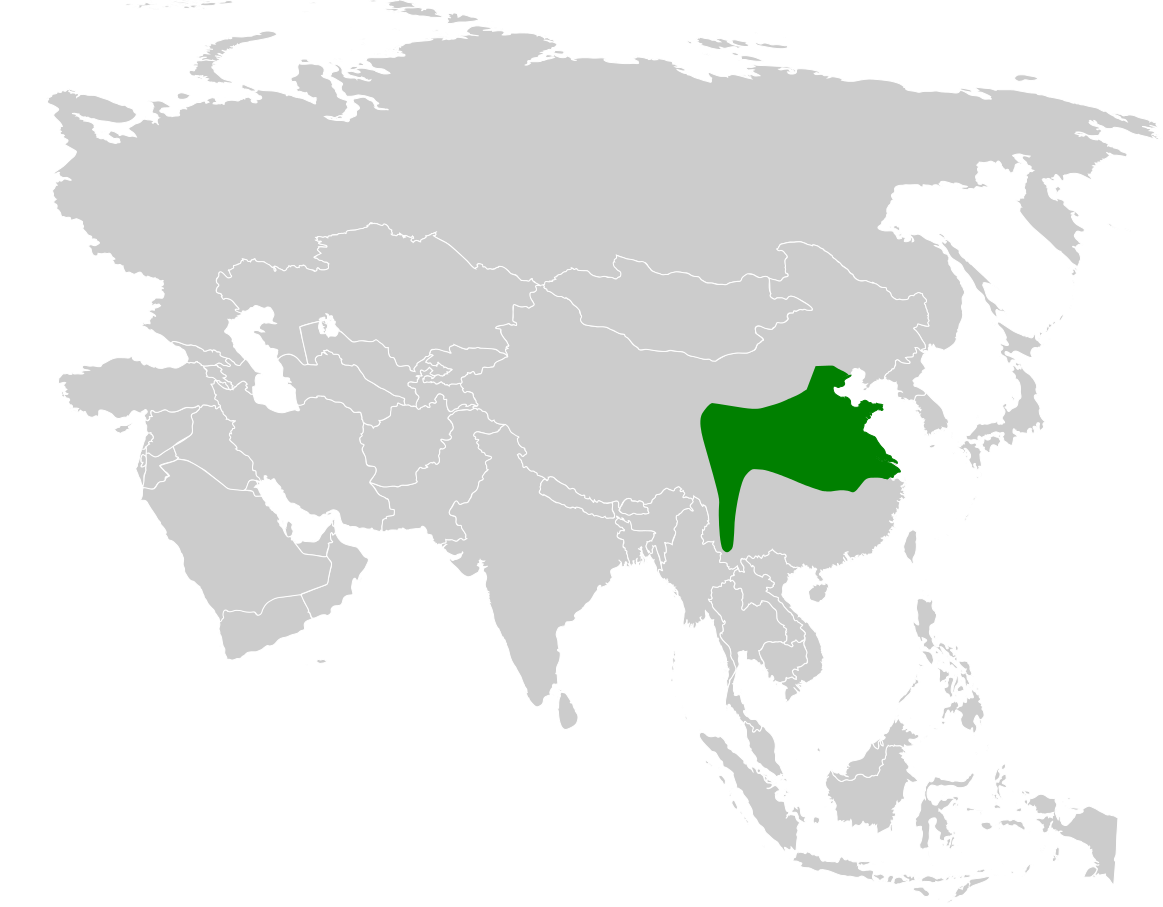

= Silver-throated bushtit =

Species of bird

The silver-throated bushtit or silver-throated tit (Aegithalos glaucogularis) is a species of passerine bird in the family Aegithalidae, widespread throughout the temperate forests of Central, East and parts of North and Western China. The bird's native habitats are mainly along the middle/lower Yangtze and Yellow River basins, although there is also a small southwestern habitat extension in Yunnan along the Lancang valley within the Hengduan Mountains. It has two recognized subspecies.

== History ==
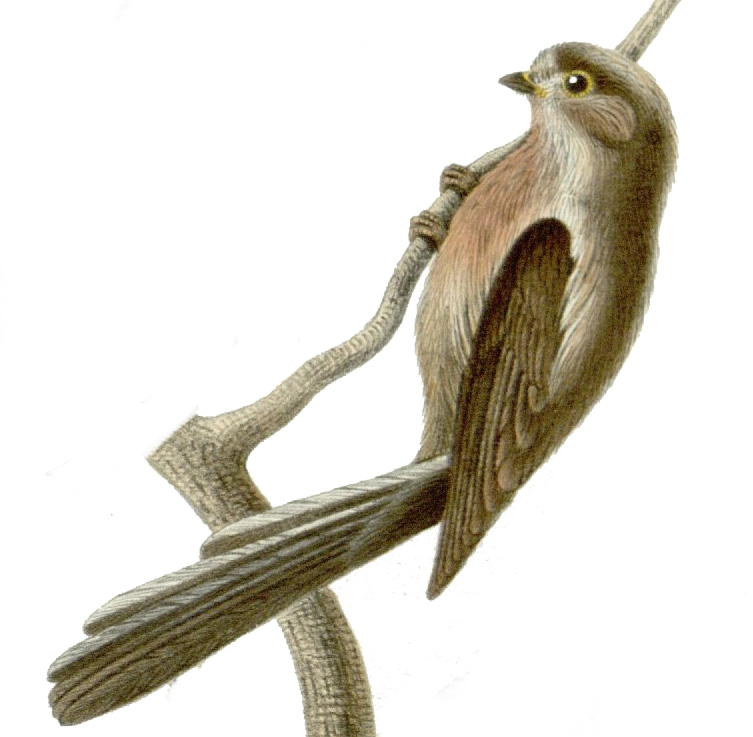
Illustration by Josephe Huët

A paper on the silver-throated bushtit by the English naturalist Frederic Moore was read at a meeting of the Zoological Society of London on 27 June 1854. The English ornithologist John Gould then included the silver-throated bushtit in his book The Birds of Asia and cited Moore's paper. Gould used Moore's specific name but a different genus to obtain the binomial name Mecistura glaucogularis. He specified the type locality as Shanghai. As Gould's work appeared in print in 1855 before the publication of the proceedings of the Zoological Society, under the rules of the International Code of Zoological Nomenclature Gould's publication has priority. The name glaucogularis combines the Latin glaucus "glaucous" and the Neo-Latin gularis "throated".

== Taxonomy ==
The silver-throated bushtit was formerly considered a subspecies of the long-tailed tit (Aegithalos caudatus) but its plumage is distinctive and there are significant genetic differences.

Two subspecies are recognized:

- A. g. glaucogularis (Gould, 1855) – the nominate subspecies, native to the middle/lower Yangtze basin in Central East China
- A. g. vinaceus (Verreaux, J, 1871) – the northern/subalpine subspecies, native to the Yellow River basin in North China with habitat extensions into western Liaoning, central Gansu, eastern Qinghai, western Sichuan and Yunnan

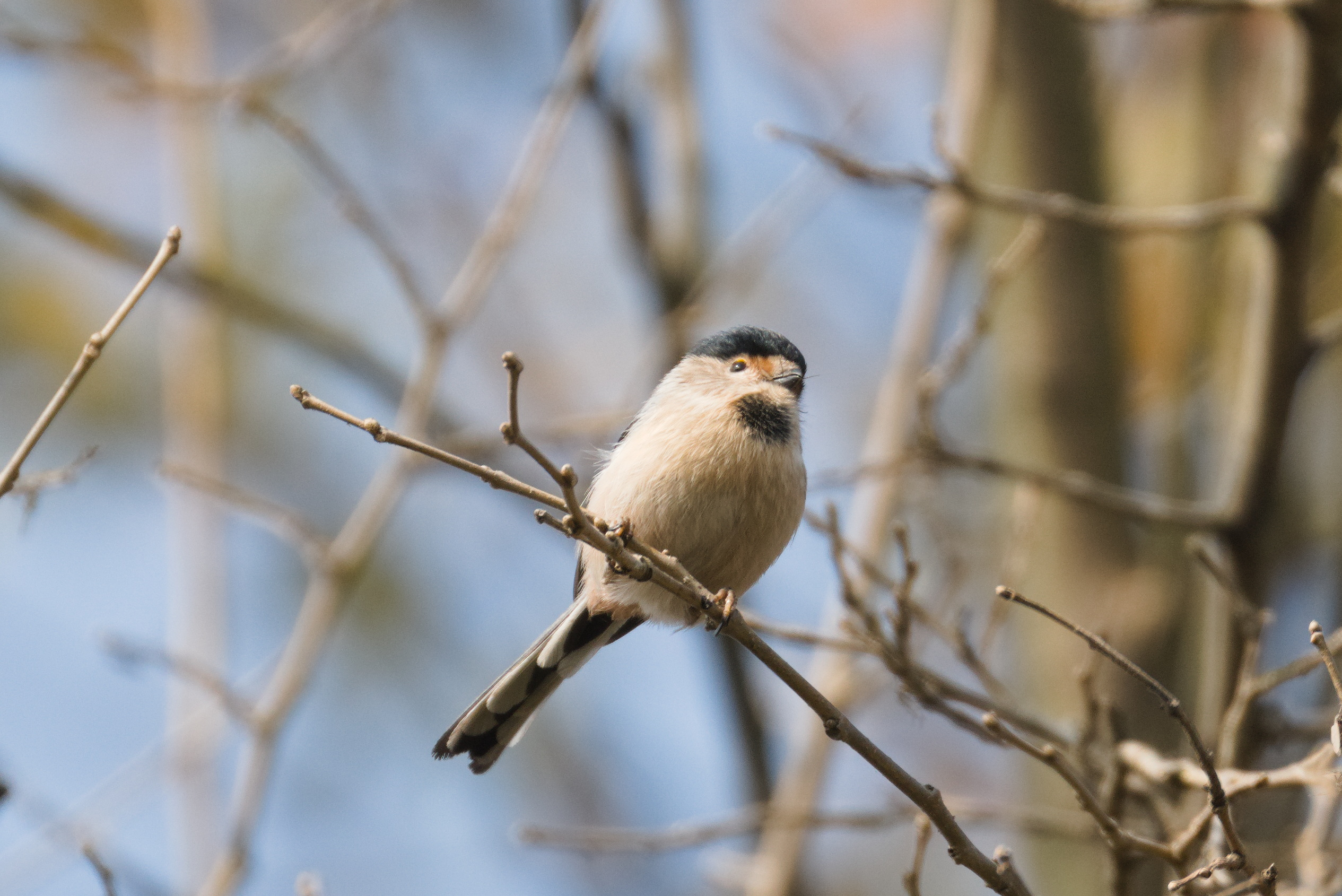
A. g. glaucogularis, Ezhou, Hubei Province, China.
