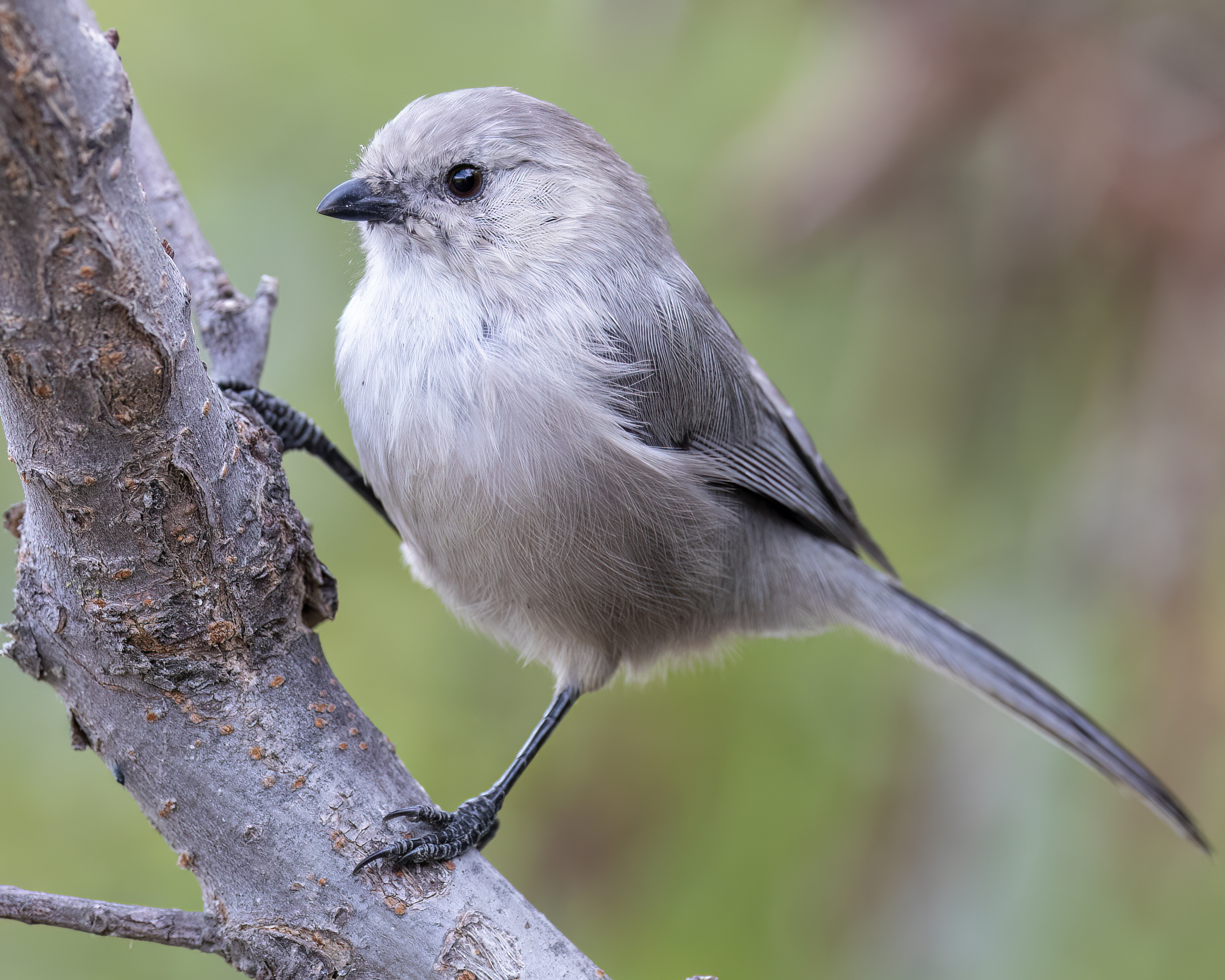
- Male P. m. californicus
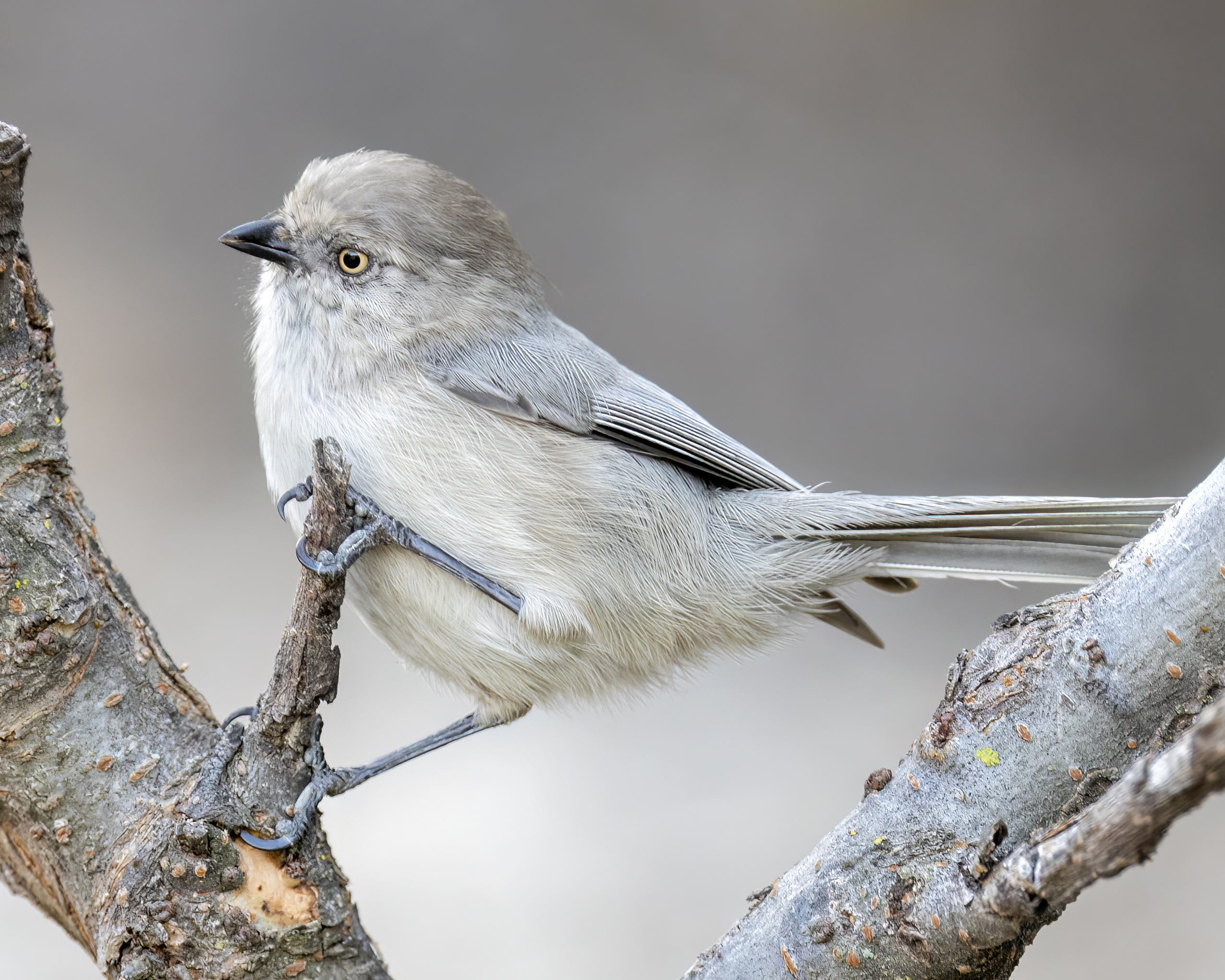
- Female P. m. californicus Song of P. minimus

Conservation status
- Least Concern (IUCN 3.1)

Scientific classification
- Kingdom: Animalia
- Phylum: Chordata
- Class: Aves
- Order: Passeriformes
- Family: Aegithalidae
- Genus: Psaltriparus; Bonaparte, 1850
- Species: P. minimus

Binomial name
- Psaltriparus minimus (Townsend, 1837)

= American bushtit =

Species of bird

The American bushtit, or simply bushtit (Psaltriparus minimus), is a social songbird belonging to the monotypic genus Psaltriparus. It is one of the smallest passerines in North America and it is the only species in the family Aegithalidae found in the Americas; the other eleven species occur in Eurasia.

The American bushtit's distinguishing characteristics are its tiny size, its plump and large head, and its long tail. Its range stretches from Vancouver in Canada, south through the Western United States, via the Great Basin, the lowlands and foothills of California, the highlands of Mexico, to Guatemala. Bushtits usually inhabit mixed open woodlands, which contains oaks and a scrubby chaparral understory. They can also be found residing in gardens and parks. Their food source is small insects, primarily, and spiders in mixed-species feeding flocks.

The sharp-shinned hawk and other raptors prey upon American bushtits. Bushtits live in flocks of 10 to 40 birds and family members sleep together in their large, hanging nest during breeding season. Once the offspring develop wings that are strong enough to fly, they leave the nest and sleep on branches. Bushtits display a unique behavior as adult males are typically the helpers that assist and raise the nestlings; hence it has intrigued many naturalists for its interesting breeding and mating patterns.

== Etymology ==
The name "bushtit" has its earliest known origins in the Latin word Parus, which stands for titmouse. The tit in titmouse comes from the Old Icelandic word titr, meaning something small.

== Taxonomy ==
The scientific name Parus minimus was given to the bushtit when it was originally described in 1837 by American naturalist and ornithologist John Kirk Townsend, where he reported that the species inhabited the forests of the Columbia River. It is now the only species placed in the genus Psaltriparus that was introduced in 1850 by the French naturalist Charles Lucien Bonaparte. The genus name Psaltriparus combines the name of the genus Psaltria that was introduced by Coenraad Temminck in 1836 for the pygmy bushtit, with Parus that was introduced by Carl Linnaeus in 1758 for the tits.

Ten subspecies recognized:

Subspecies	Authority	Breeding range
Psaltriparus minimus saturatus	Ridgway, 1903	Southwest Canada and the Northwest United States
Psaltriparus minimus minimus	Townsend, JK, 1837	Coastal Western United States
Psaltriparus minimus melanurus	Grinnell & Swarth, 1926	Southwest United States and North Baja California
Psaltriparus minimus grindae	Ridgway, 1883	South Baja California
Psaltriparus minimus californicus	Ridgway, 1884	South-central Oregon to South-central California
Psaltriparus minimus plumbeus	Baird, SF, 1854	West-central, South United States and North-central Mexico
Psaltriparus minimus dimorphicus	Van Rossem & Hachisuka, 1938	South-central United States and North-central Mexico
Psaltriparus minimus iulus	Jouy, 1894	West and Central Mexico
Psaltriparus minimus personatus	Bonaparte, 1850	South-Central Mexico
Psaltriparus minimus melanotis	Hartlaub, 1844	South Mexico and Guatemala

The subspecies P. m. melanotis was previously considered as a separate species due to their black ears.

== Description ==
With a length of 100–110 mm (3.9–4.3 in) and a weight of 4.5–6 g (0.16–0.21 oz), the American bushtit is one of the smallest passerines in North America. It is mostly gray-brown, with a large head, short neck, long tail, and small, stubby beak. American bushtits have different characteristics based on their sex and habitats. The male has dark brown to black eyes while the adult female has yellow eyes. Additionally, bushtits resident near the coast tend to have a brown "cap" or "crown", while those further inland have a brown "mask" on their face, and those in Mexico and Central America have a black cheek. This feature does not occur in the northern part of the American bushtits' range and in the United States is confined to near the Mexican border, mainly in Texas. None of the bushtits in that location with the black ear patch are adult females; the majority of them are juvenile males with one or two dark lines on their faces rather than a whole patch. Only from the northeastern Mexican highlands and farther south does the black-eared variant become more prevalent; all males have a full black ear patch, and even mature females have a black arc covering their eyes and typically a black line across them.

=== Identification ===
Identification	Description	
Male (Pacific)	Tiny with a chubby appearance, large head, a lengthy tail, and a compact bill. Their feathers are predominantly plain shades of brown and gray, though the specific plumage colors differ based on their geographic location.	Male 'Pacific' bushtit in Chilliwack, British Columbia.
Male (Interior)	Tiny with a long tail and short bill. They display a lighter shade of gray with gray crowns and tan cheeks, whereas those residing near the coast exhibit brown crowns.	Male 'interior' bushtit in Utah.
Male (Black-eared)	Males in southwest Texas to Mexico have a black mask and display a shade of brown. The mask color tends to get darker further to the south.	Male 'black-eared' bushtit in Mexico City.
Female (Pacific)	As the male, but with pale yellow eyes.	Female 'Pacific' bushtit in Western Washington state.
Female (Interior)	They display grayer crowns and brown cheeks with pale yellow eyes.	Female in southern Arizona, intermediate between interior and black-eared.
Female (Black-eared)	Females in southwest Texas to Mexico have a brown mask and display a shade of light brown. The mask color tends to become darker further to the south.	Female in southern Arizona, intermediate between interior and black-eared.

== Behavior ==
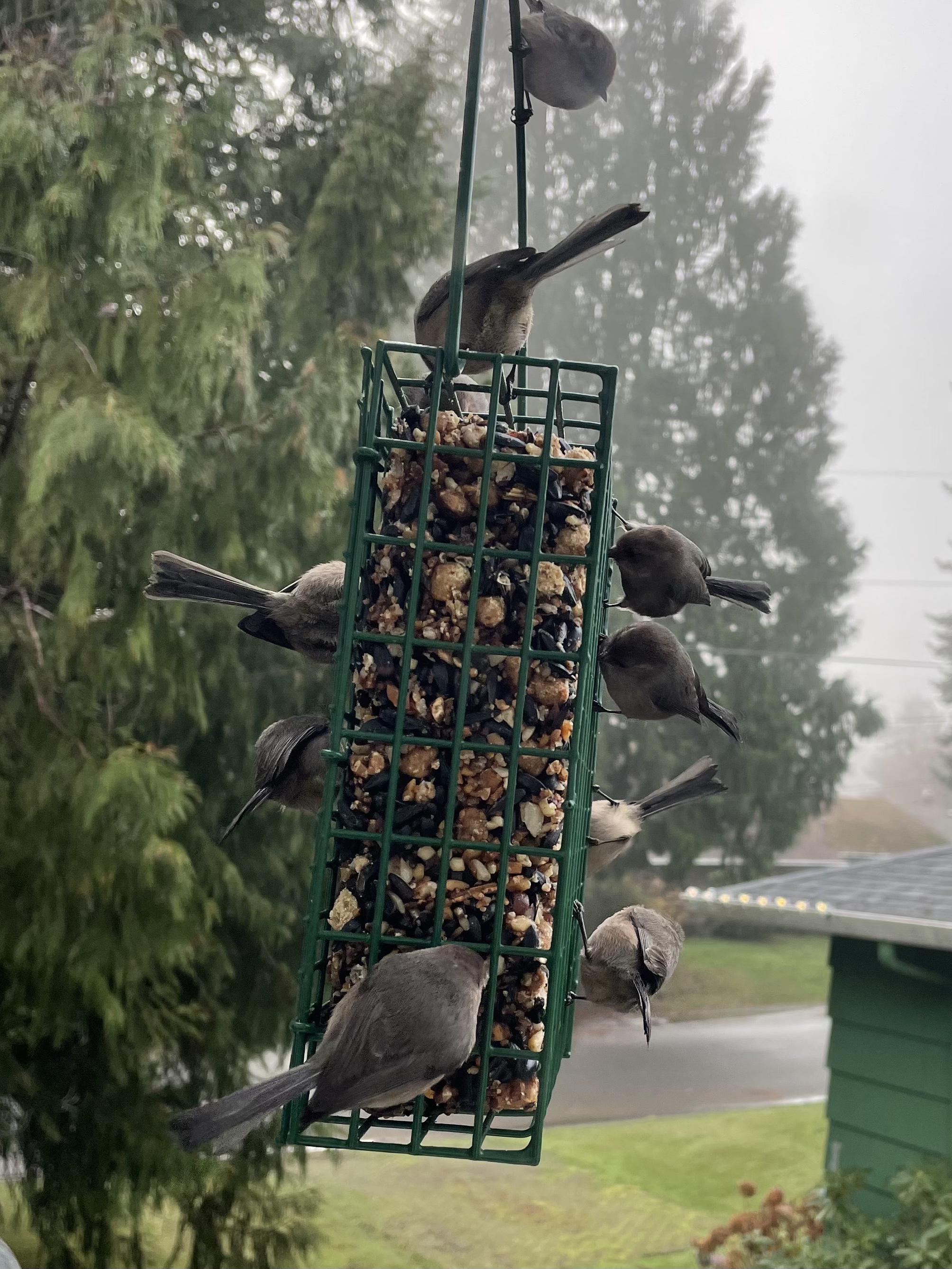
Congregating on feeder, Tumwater, Washington

Bushtits usually inhabit mixed open woodlands, which contains oaks and a scrubby chaparral understory. It can also be found residing in gardens and parks. It lives under the highland parts of Mexico and the western United States to Vancouver, via the Great Basin, the lowlands and foothills of California, southern Mexico, and Guatemala.

The American bushtit has an active and social demeanor. This species forms flocks of 10 to 40 individuals of various species, including chickadees and warblers, to forage for tiny insects and spiders. Group members frequently communicate with one another through brief calls.

=== Nesting ===
Both the males and females work together to construct the hanging nest, which can take up to a month to complete. The nest features a hole near the top that goes down into the nest bowl, and it hangs up to a foot below its anchor point. Using spider webs and plant material, the adults create an elastic sac. Occasionally, they sit inside the nest while it's still being built, which stretches it downward. They cover the outside with fragments of adjacent plants, including the tree the nest is made in, and add insulating materials like feathers, fur, and downy plant debris. All the adults connected to the nest, including the breeding pair and helpers, sleep there when it's in use. Typically, the couple uses the same nest for their second brood of the year. Regarding its placement, the male and female hang spiderwebs from mistletoe or other foliage to test-sites for their nests. Nest locations are typically found on tree trunks or branches, ranging in height from 1.25–7.5 m, rarely to 15 m.

=== Breeding ===
Female bushtits lay plain white oval eggs in batches of 4-10, but both parents share the responsibility of incubation for 11–13 days. The egg is 13.7 mm long and 10 mm wide. Once the chicks hatch, both the male and female bushtits cooperate to feed and care for them for 14–18 days. They can raise 1-2 broods a year, and older siblings from the first brood may assist in feeding the next.

During the breeding season, male and female bushtits form pairs, actively participate in nest-building, and both engage in rearing the young. They are aided by other adult males who bring food to the nesting pair's nest. Remarkably, during this time, the entire bushtit family sleeps together in their large, hanging nest, unlike most breeding birds where only one adult typically sleeps on the nest at a time. After the young birds fledge, they move to sleeping on branches.

However, bushtits can be sensitive during the breeding process. If they are disturbed in the early nesting stages, they may abandon their nesting attempt and potentially seek a different mate.

== Gallery ==
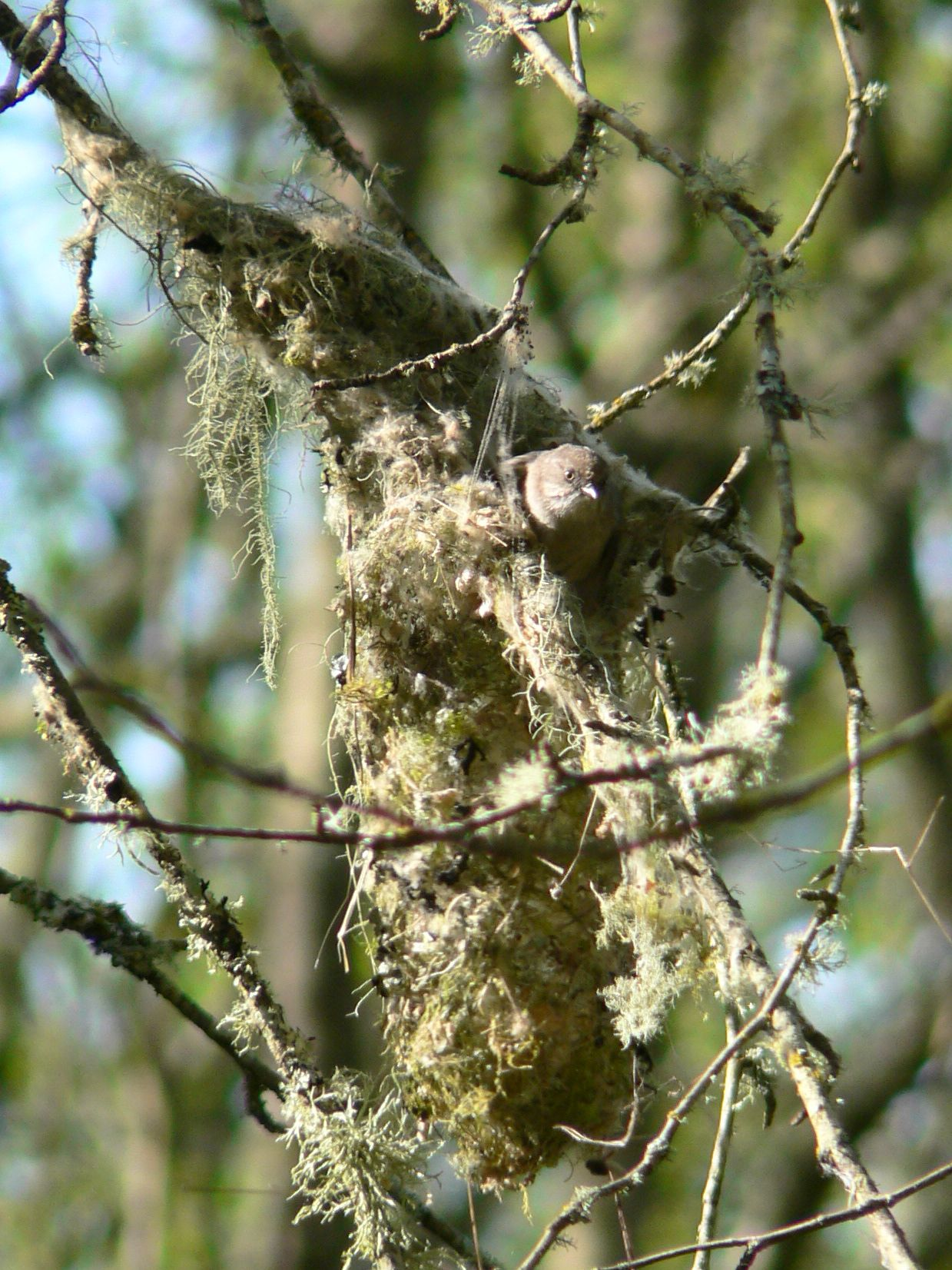
Nest

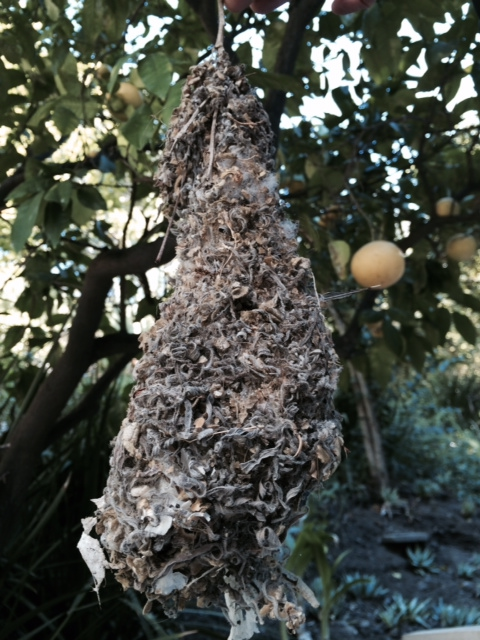
Nest

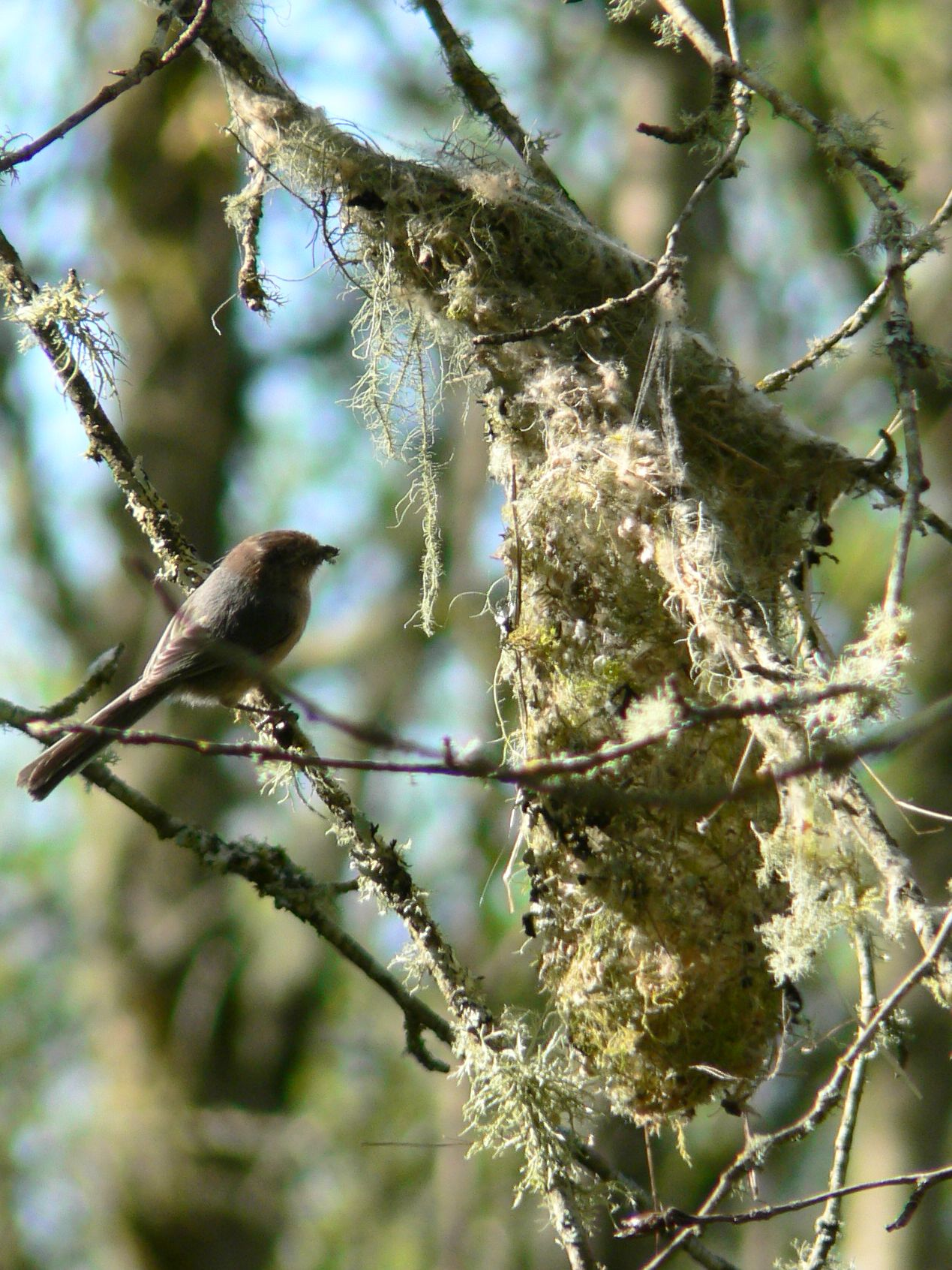
Nest

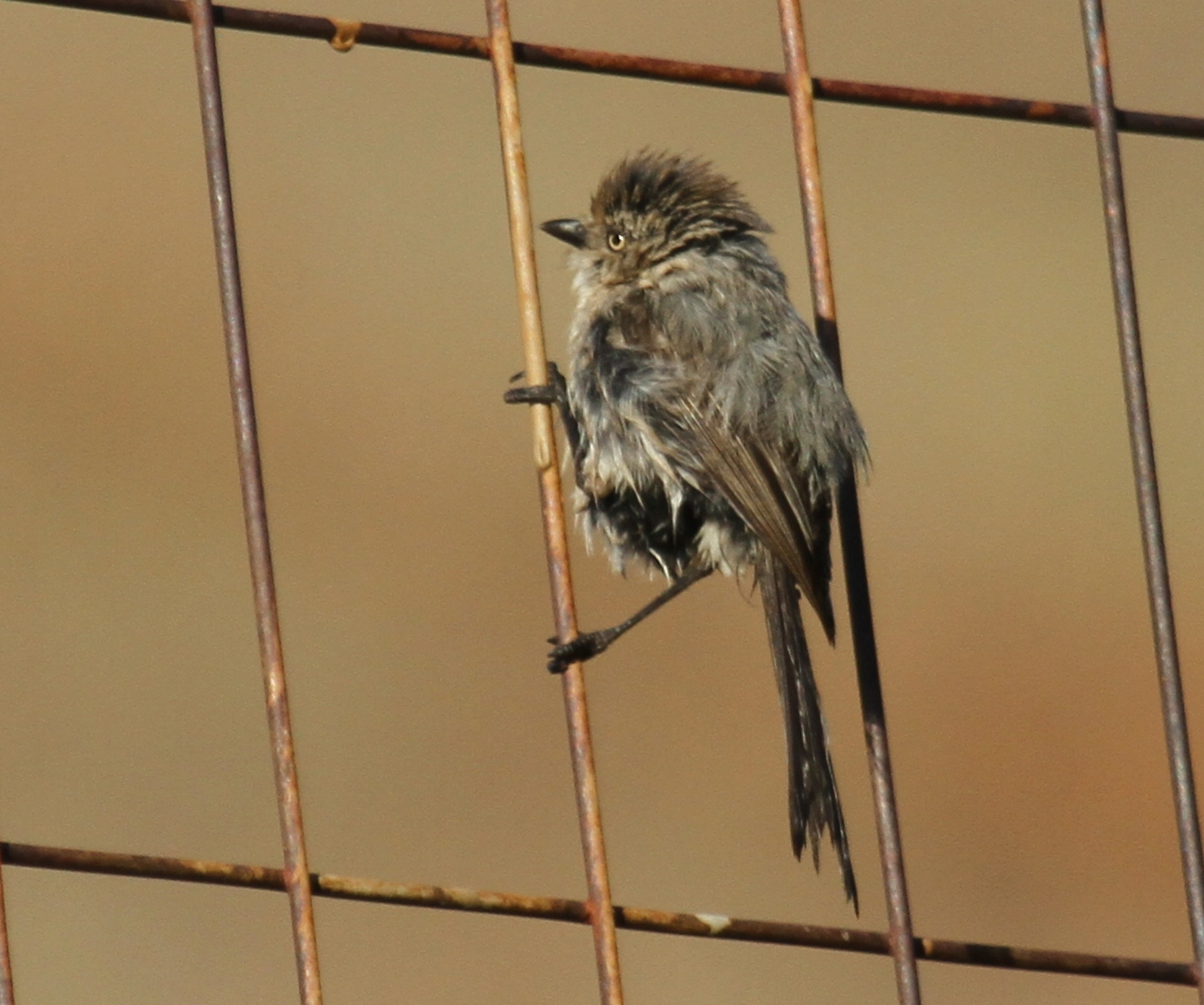
Bushtit in Pleasanton, California

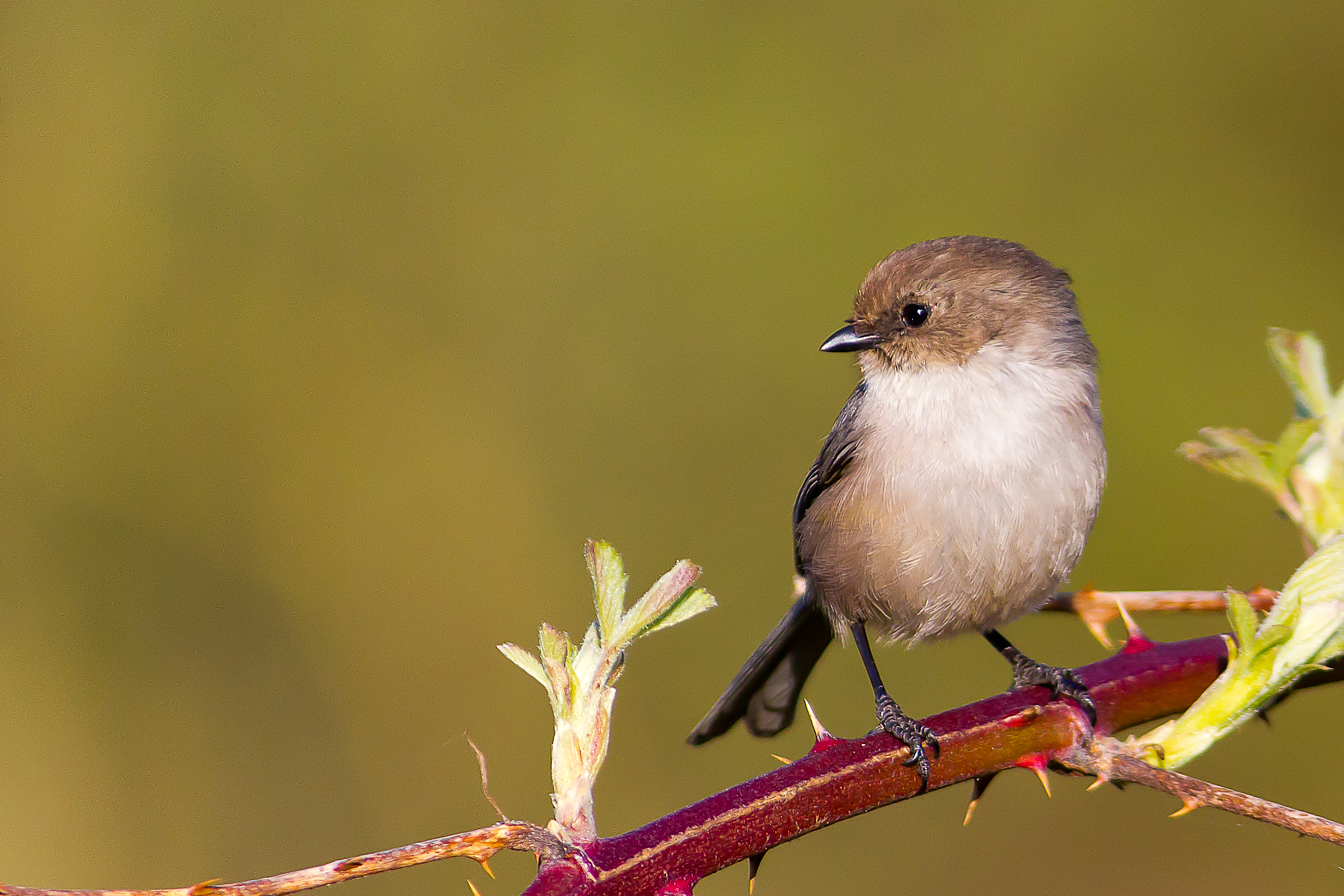
In Chilliwack, British Columbia, Canada
