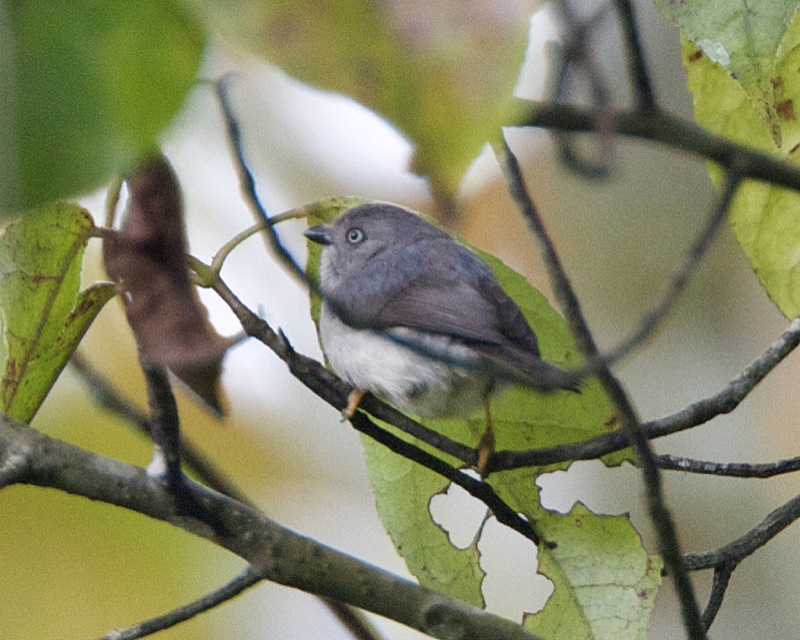

Conservation status
- Least Concern (IUCN 3.1)

Scientific classification
- Kingdom: Animalia
- Phylum: Chordata
- Class: Aves
- Order: Passeriformes
- Family: Aegithalidae
- Genus: Aegithalos
- Species: A. exilis

Binomial name
- Aegithalos exilis (Temminck, 1836)
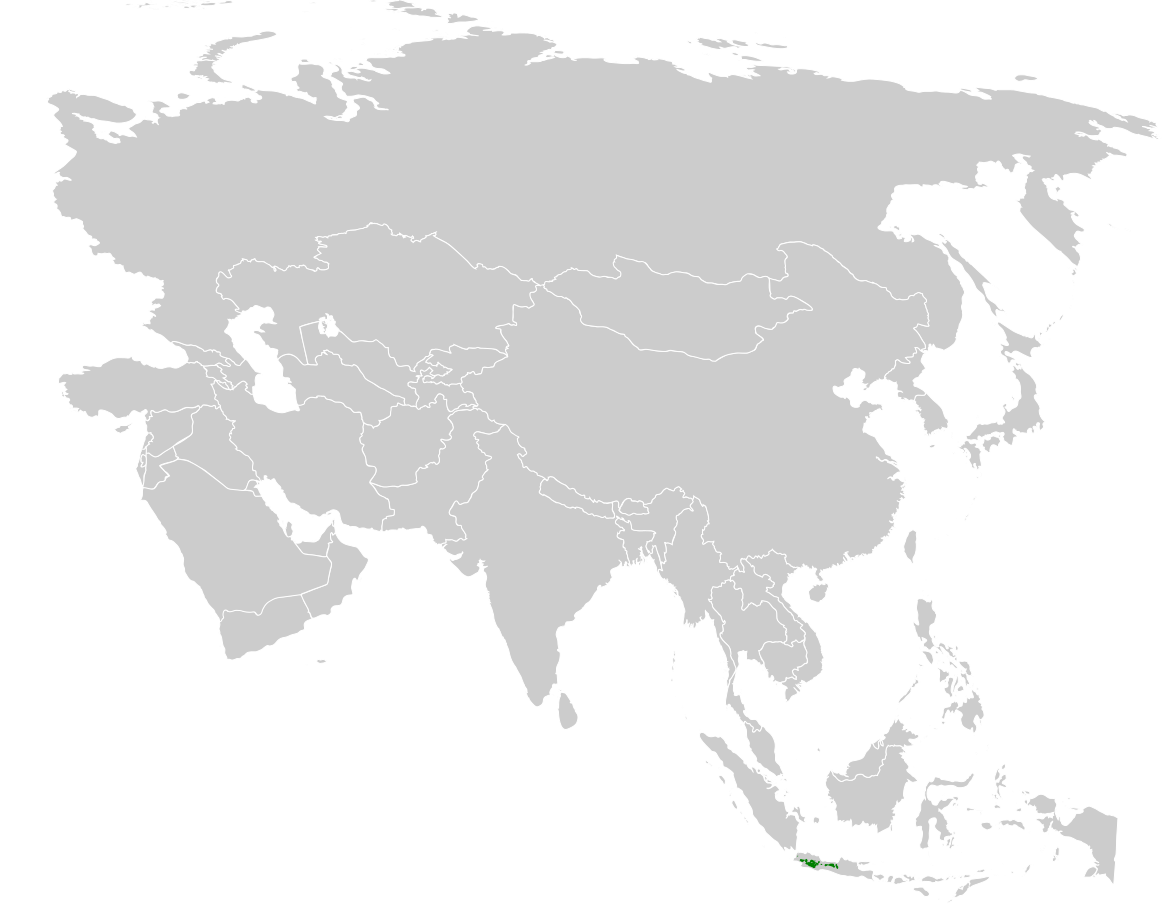

Synonyms
- Psaltria exilis, Pygmy Tit

= Pygmy bushtit =

Species of bird

The pygmy bushtit (Aegithalos exilis), also called the pygmy tit, is the smallest species of passerine bird. It is in the Aegithalidae family, containing the long-tailed tits. This drab-coloured bird is endemic to Indonesia, where it is only found in montane forests on the island of Java. It is a social songbird, living in small flocks, and a popular bird among bird watchers at Mt Gede and its adjacent botanical gardens. Relative to other members of the Aegithalidae family, it is not well studied and much remains unknown.

== Taxonomy ==
The pygmy bushtit was first described by Dutch naturalist Coenraad Jacob Temminck in 1836 in the third volume of his book "Nouveau recueil de planches coloriées d'oiseaux". The pygmy tit was originally put in the monotypic genus Psaltria, until a genetic study in 2016 showed they are nested in the Aegithalos genus, with their closest relative being the black-throated bushtit (Aegithalos concinnu). Today, many books and articles still have the pygmy tit listed in the genus Psaltria.

The term Psaltria translates to "female harpist" in Latin. This could be a reference to the pygmy tits voice. The term Aegithalos was used by Aristotle to describe three species of European tits; the long-tailed tit (Aegithalos caudaus), the great tit (Parus major), and the European blue tit (Cyanistes caeruleus). Exilis is the Latin word meaning "little" or "slender", a reference to the pygmy tits petite size.

== Description ==
The pygmy bushtit is 85 millimetres (3.3 in) long, with about half of its length belonging to the tail. The bird has dull coloration with the head being a drab brown color with a cinnamon-tinged forehead. The upperparts and wings are a medium grey with a brownish tinge and the rump is a purer grey. Worn flight feathers may appear slightly paler than newer ones. The long tail is a dull grey-brown, with the outermost feathers slightly more pale at the tip. The throat and chin are a light grey with a pale pinkish-buff mottling and border. The breast and flank are greyish-brown, with a faint narrow breastband across the chest. The remaining underparts, including the underwing is a pale pinkish-buff colour. Both sexes look alike.

The eyes are a yellowish-white, sometimes brown or grey with age. The bill is short with a broad base and can be grey, dark brown or black in colour. The legs are yellow.

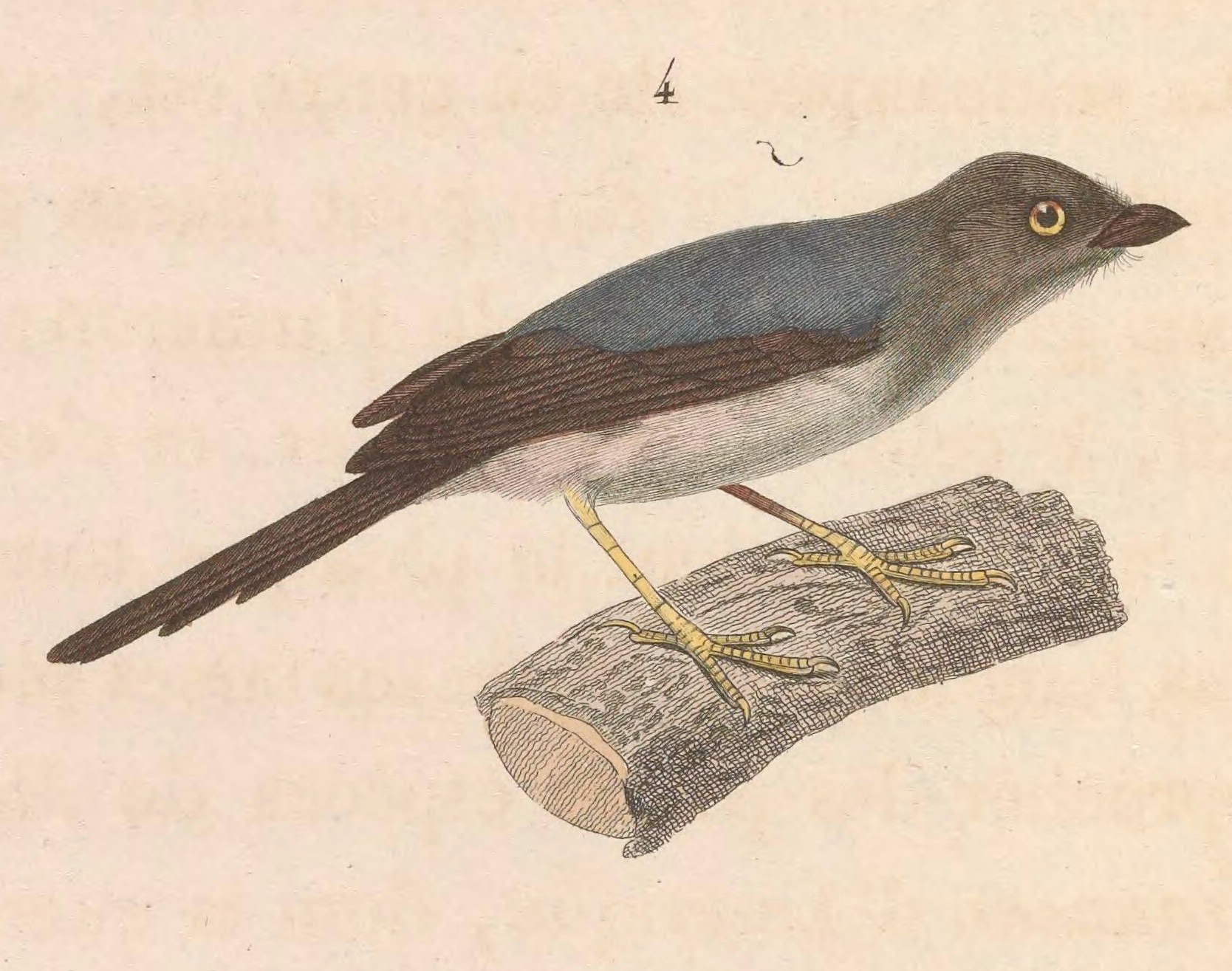
Original drawing of Psaltria exilis, 1838

The pygmy bushtit weighs less than 5 grams (0.18 oz), making it smaller than many hummingbirds. The wings measure 40–49 millimetres (1.6–1.9 in) in males and 42–44 millimetres (1.7–1.7 in) in females. The tail measures 38–42 millimetres (1.5–1.7 in) in males and 33–39 millimetres (1.3–1.5 in) in females. The bill measures 6.3–8.9 millimetres (0.25–0.35 in). Juveniles remain undescribed but are presumed to be similar to adults.

== Distribution and habitat ==
The pygmy bushtit is the only Indomalayan member of the Aegithalidae family. It is only found on the island of Java in Indonesia where it inhabits montane forests and plantations above 1,000 metres (3,300 ft), but can occasionally be seen as low as 830 metres (2,720 ft). They live on the edge of coniferous and open tree forests in the mountains of central and western Java. They are a non-migratory species that may move altitudinally.

== Behaviour ==
=== Vocalization ===
The pygmy bushtit's voice is quite similar to many long-tailed tits and bushtits in its contact calls and lack of a territorial song. Most vocalizations are a combination of up to three elements: a high-pitched si or sisisi which can be prolonged becoming more of a silili, a high-pitched, raspy srrrr, and a soft chip, tchip, or, sip.

All members of the genus Aegithalos are very vocal due to their highly social nature. Communication is constant among flock members with a variety of soft, clipped monosyllable calls and short silvery trills. Calls can be quiet and subdued or loud and far-carrying. Both sexes emit quiet twittering and trilling sounds that are especially aggressive during copulation and encounters with conspecifics.

=== Food and feeding ===
The pygmy bushtit feeds primarily on insects including aphids (Aphidoidea) and caterpillars, as well as small spiders (Araneae). Plants such as berries or seeds are occasionally consumed by some long-tailed tits during the winter.

Members of the long-tails tit family forage actively in small flocks, often at low levels. The pygmy bushtit generally forages arboreally in the shrub layer or canopy, rarely visiting the ground. Prey is generally gleaned of branches, leaves and buds, rarely taken while in the air. They have been known to hang upside down from branches and to manipulate leaves to locate hidden prey.

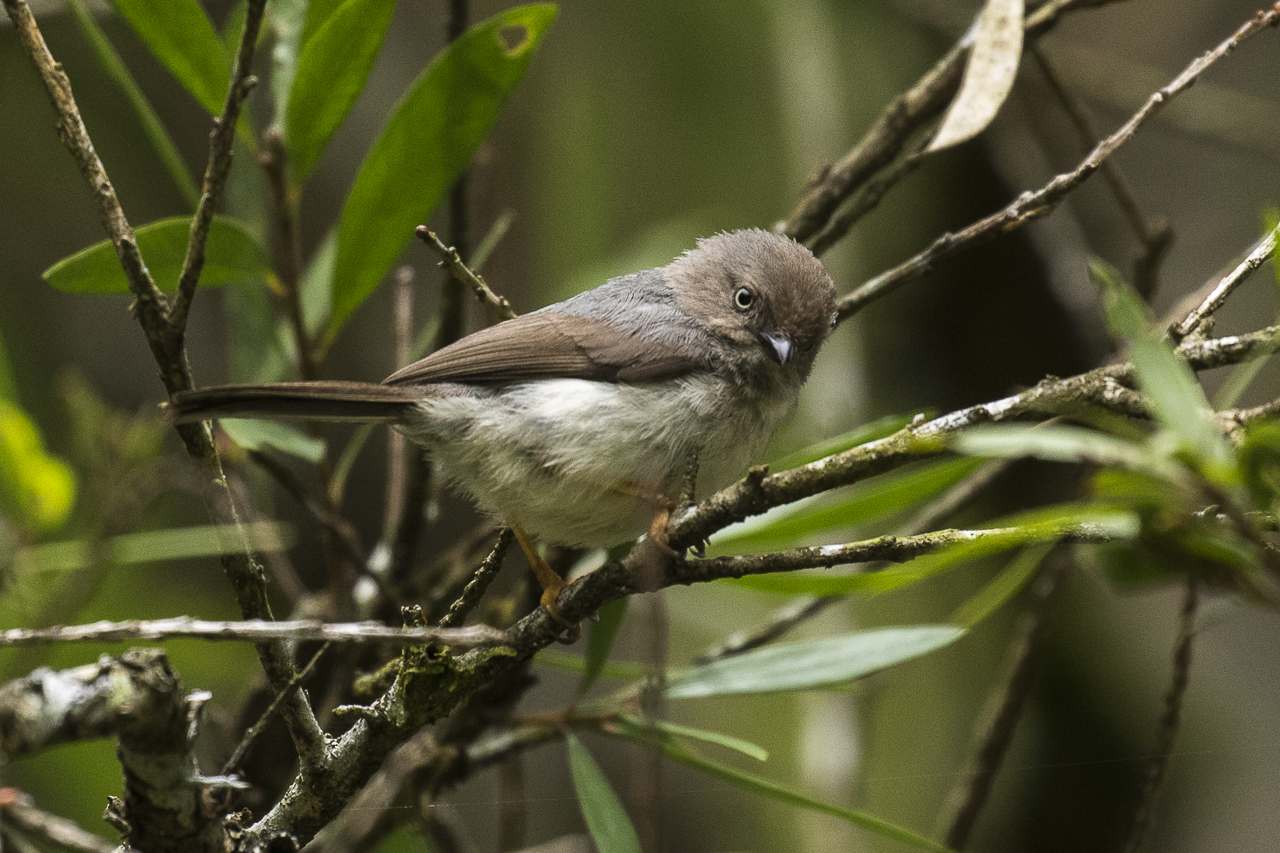
Pygmy Bushtit

=== Breeding ===
Little is known about pygmy tit reproduction. The pygmy bushtit has two breeding seasons: March through May and August through November. The nest is an 8–17 centimetre (3.1–6.7 in) tall 6–8.5 centimetre (2.4–3.3 in) wide pouch of leaves and grass lined with moss. The nest is suspended with a 2–3 centimetres (0.79–1.18 in) wide entrance hole near the top and inner chamber that is 3–5.5 centimetres (1.2–2.2 in) deep. The nest is similar to the nests of flowerpeckers (Dicaeidae).

The female tit lays a clutch of 2-3 eggs about 11.8–13.4 by 9.3–10.6 millimetres (0.46 in–0.53 in × 0.37 in–0.42 in) that are white with fine red spots.

Members of the Aegithalos family are generally monogamous, with both parents contributing to offspring care and many species utilizing relatives as helpers. It is not known if the pigmy tit utilizes these techniques. Nothing further is known about pygmy tit breeding biology.

== Conservation status ==
The pygmy bushtit is not globally threatened and is currently listed as least concern under the IUCN redlist as of 2024. It is locally common and a restricted range species. The exact number of individuals is not known but its population trend is decreasing. The pygmy tits current threats are unknown, however the densely populated island of Java could faces issues as the mountain forests could be threatened by deforestation over time.
