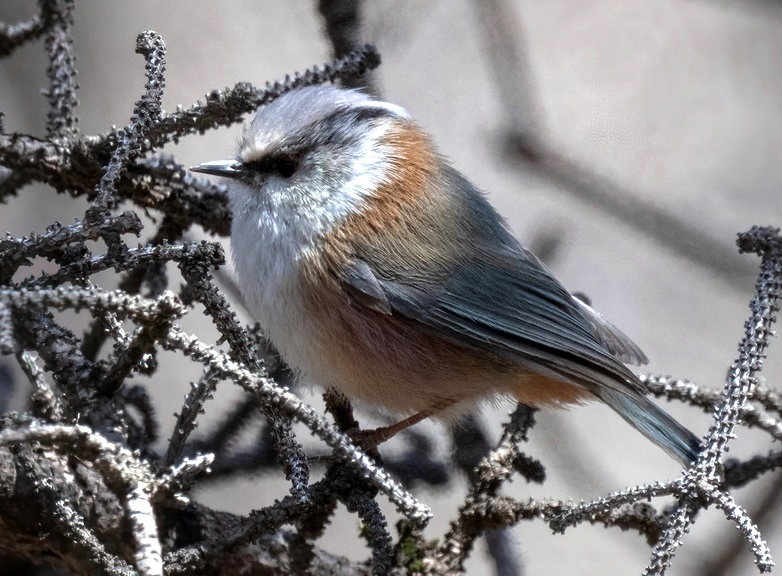

Conservation status
- Least Concern (IUCN 3.1)

Scientific classification
- Kingdom: Animalia
- Phylum: Chordata
- Class: Aves
- Order: Passeriformes
- Family: Aegithalidae
- Genus: Leptopoecile
- Species: L. elegans

Binomial name
- Leptopoecile elegans Przewalski, 1887
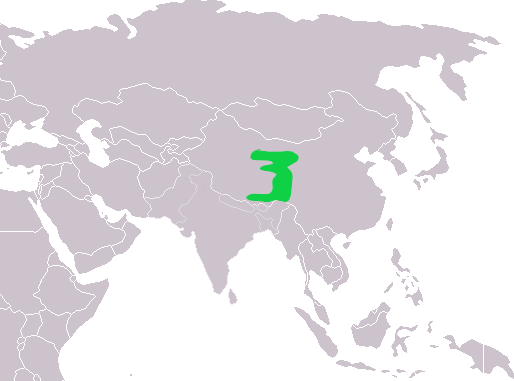

= Crested tit-warbler =

Species of bird

The crested tit-warbler (Leptopoecile elegans) is a species of bird in the family Aegithalidae. It is found in China and possibly India. Its natural habitat is boreal forest. It generally has a red hint to it and a bit of blue on, or near, its wings. The tail is of an emerald green colour.

This species is considered monotypic, although it was previously divided into two subspecies: the type subspecies and the subspecies meissneri, which was lumped with elegans in 2022.
