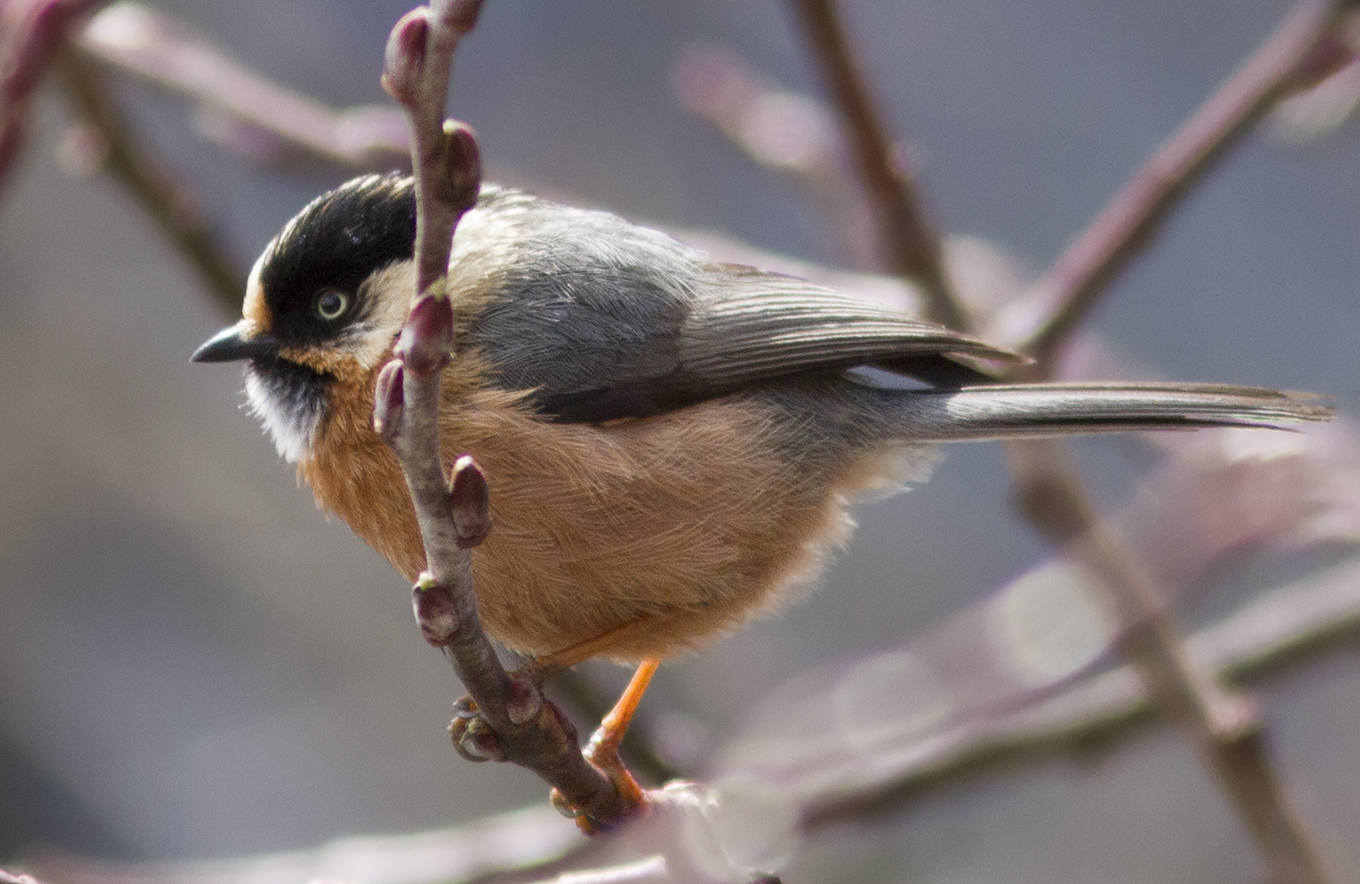
- In Bhutan
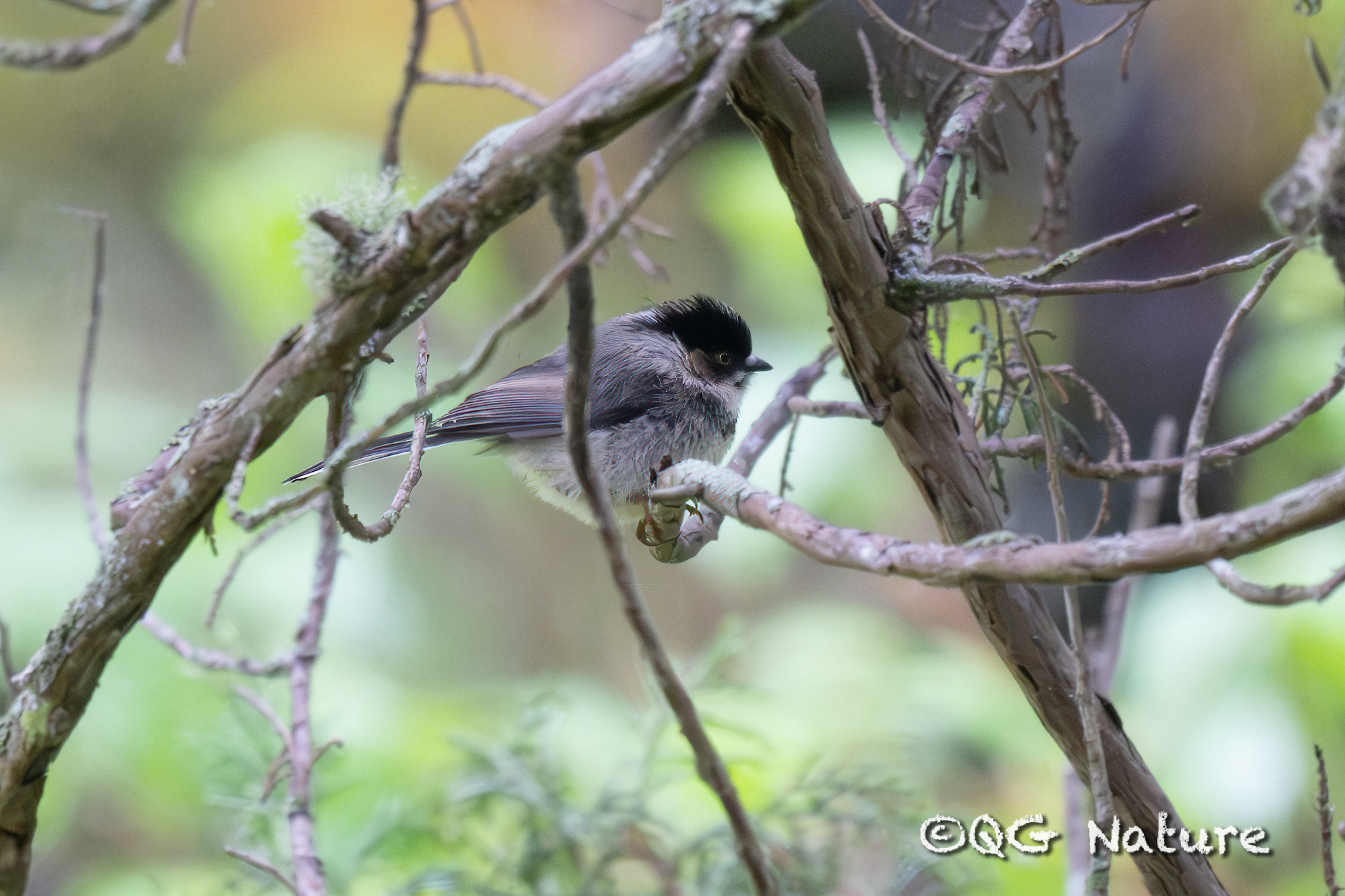

Conservation status
- Least Concern (IUCN 3.1)

Scientific classification
- Kingdom: Animalia
- Phylum: Chordata
- Class: Aves
- Order: Passeriformes
- Family: Aegithalidae
- Genus: Aegithalos
- Species: A. iouschistos

Binomial name
- Aegithalos iouschistos (Blyth, 1845)
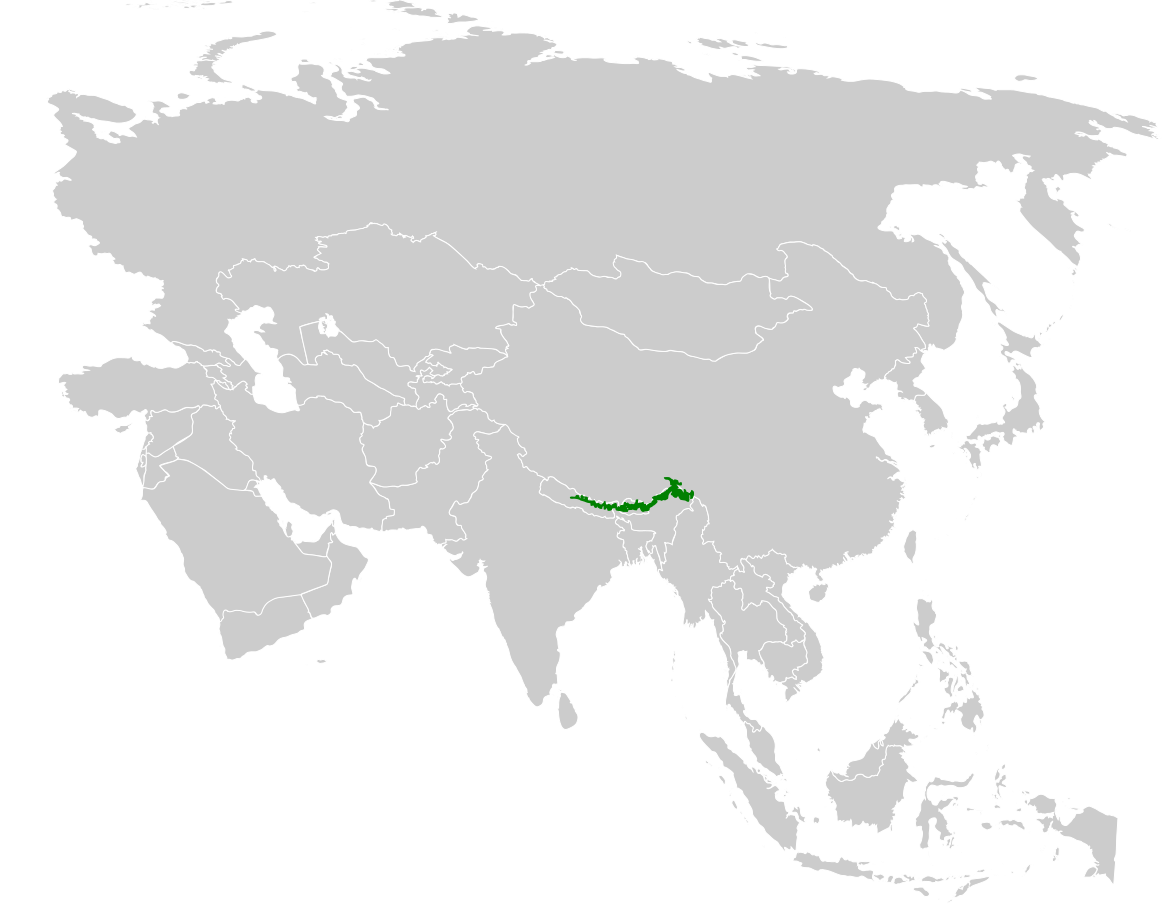

= Black-browed bushtit =

Species of bird

The black-browed bushtit (Aegithalos iouschistos), also known as the black-browed tit or rufous-fronted bushtit, is a species of bird in the family Aegithalidae. It is found in mid-southern China and sporadically in Myanmar. Its natural habitats are boreal forests and temperate forests. The subspecies A. b. sharpei (Burmese tit) of western Burma and A. i. bonvaloti of southern China have sometimes been treated as separate species.

== Taxonomy ==
The black-browed bushtit was formally described in 1845 by the English zoologist Edward Blyth based on a specimen collected in Bengal. He coined the binomial name Parus iouschistos. The specific epithet combines the Ancient Greek ιοεις/ioeis meaning "dark" with Late Latin schistus meaning "slate". The black-browed bushtit is now one of eight species placed in the genus Aegithalos that was introduced in 1804 by the French naturalist Johann Hermann.

Four subspecies are recognised:

- Aegithalos iouschistos iouschistos (Blyth, E, 1845), the rufous-fronted bushtit – Himalayas (Nepal to northern India and southeastern Tibet)
- Aegithalos iouschistos bonvaloti (Oustalet, J-FÉ, 1892) – southern China (southeastern Tibet to Sichuan and Yunnan) and northeastern Myanmar
- Aegithalos iouschistos obscuratus (Mayr, E, 1940) – mountains of western China (Sungpan region of northeastern Sichuan)
- Aegithalos iouschistos sharpei (Rippon, G, 1904), the Burmese bushtit – montane forest of southwestern Myanmar (Mount Victoria)

The subspecies A. i. bonvaloti and A. i. sharpei have sometimes been considered as separate species, but the genetic differences are relatively small.

== Description ==
It is a small, long-tailed bird, 11–12 centimetres (4.3–4.7 in) long. It has grey upperparts, rufous breast and flanks and a white belly. The head is buff with a broad black mask, white forehead and a white bib, speckled black in the centre. The subspecies A. b. sharpei has white rather than buff on the head, a dark breastband and a buff belly.
