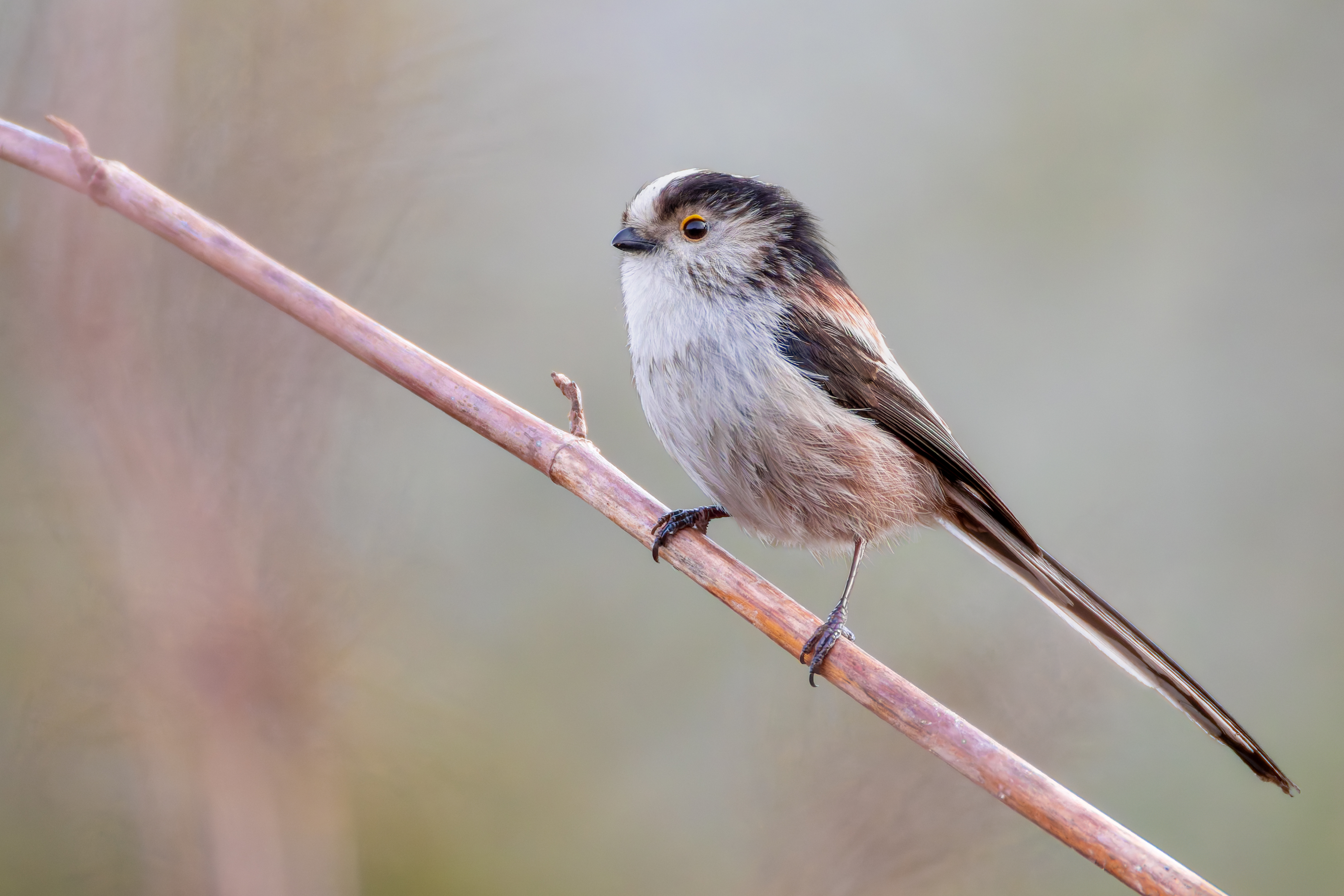
- Long-tailed tit (Ae. caudatus europaeus), France

Scientific classification
- Kingdom: Animalia
- Phylum: Chordata
- Class: Aves
- Order: Passeriformes
- Family: Aegithalidae
- Genus: Aegithalos; Hermann, 1804

Type species
- Pipra europaea Hermann, 1804 = Aegithalos caudatus europaeus (Hermann, 1804)

Species
- see text

Synonyms
- Orites G.R.Gray, 1841 (preoccupied: non Keyserling & Blasius, 1840: synonym; non Moehring, 1758: suppressed)

= Aegithalos =

Genus of birds

Aegithalos is a genus of passerine birds in the family Aegithalidae (bushtits), encompassing the majority of the species in the family. They are native to Europe and Asia.

== Taxonomy ==
The genus Aegithalos was introduced in 1804 by the French naturalist Johann Hermann to accommodate a single species, which he had otherwise tentatively named Pipra europaea Hermann, 1804. This is a subspecies of Parus caudatus Linnaeus, 1758, now Aegithalos caudatus europaeus, the central European long-tailed tit. The genus name is a term used by Aristotle for some European tits, including the long-tailed tit.

== Species ==
The genus contains the following eight species:

Image	Common name	Scientific name	Subspecies	Distribution
	Long-tailed tit	Aegithalos caudatus	17	Throughout Europe and northern Asia, east to Kamchatka and Japan.
	Silver-throated bushtit	Aegithalos glaucogularis	2	Central and eastern China and south towards Yunnan.
	White-cheeked bushtit	Aegithalos leucogenys	Monotypic	Afghanistan, Kashmir region, and Pakistan.
	Pygmy bushtit	Aegithalos exilis	Monotypic	Western and central Java, Indonesia.
	Black-throated bushtit	Aegithalos concinnus	7	Foothills of the Himalaya, across northern India through north-eastern Bangladesh, Nepal, Bhutan, northern Myanmar, China, Vietnam, to Taiwan; includes Ae. c. annamensis and Ae. c. iredalei, formerly sometimes treated as separate species.
	White-throated bushtit	Aegithalos niveogularis	Monotypic	India, Nepal, and Pakistan.
	Black-browed bushtit	Aegithalos iouschistos	4	Eastern and central Himalayas in Bhutan, China, India, Nepal and far northern Burma; includes Ae. i. bonvaloti and Ae. i. sharpei, formerly sometimes treated as separate species.
	Sooty bushtit	Aegithalos fuliginosus	Monotypic	central China.

== Fossil record ==
- Aegithalos gaspariki (Late Miocene of Polgardi, Hungary)
- Aegithalos congruis (Pliocene of Csarnota, Hungary)
