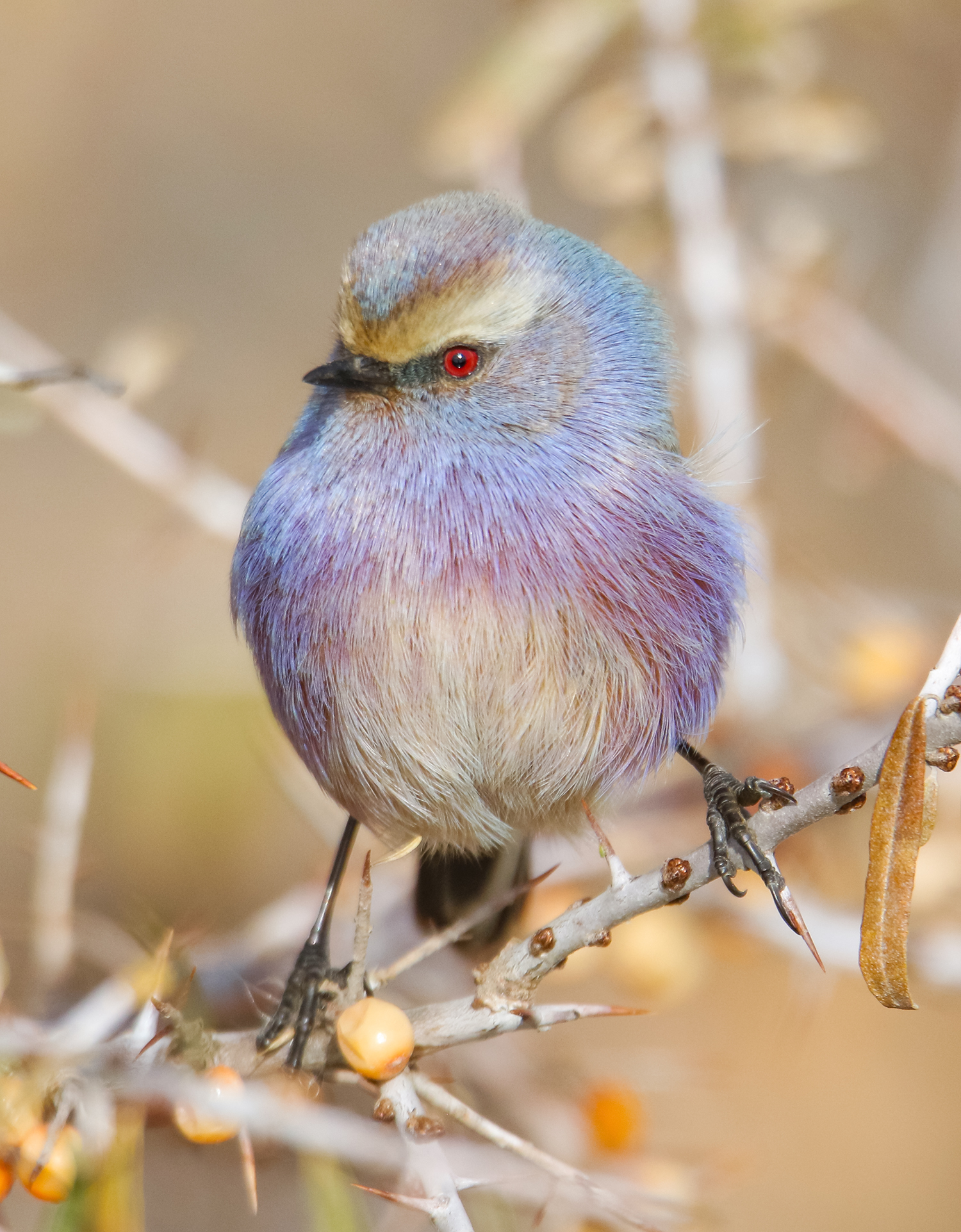
- White-browed tit-warbler Leptopoecile sophiae

Scientific classification
- Kingdom: Animalia
- Phylum: Chordata
- Class: Aves
- Order: Passeriformes
- Family: Aegithalidae
- Genus: Leptopoecile; Severtzov, 1873

Type species
- Leptopoecile sophiae Severtzov, 1873

= Leptopoecile =

Tit-warblers

Genus of birds

Leptopoecile is a genus of birds in the long-tailed tit family Aegithalidae. The genus was once placed in the large family Sylviidae, but analysis of mitochondrial DNA placed it with the long-tailed tits.

The genus contains two species:

Image	Common name	Scientific name	Distribution
	White-browed tit-warbler	Leptopoecile sophiae	the Himalayas, the Tibetan Plateau, and much of Northwest China.
	Crested tit-warbler	Leptopoecile elegans	China and possibly India.
