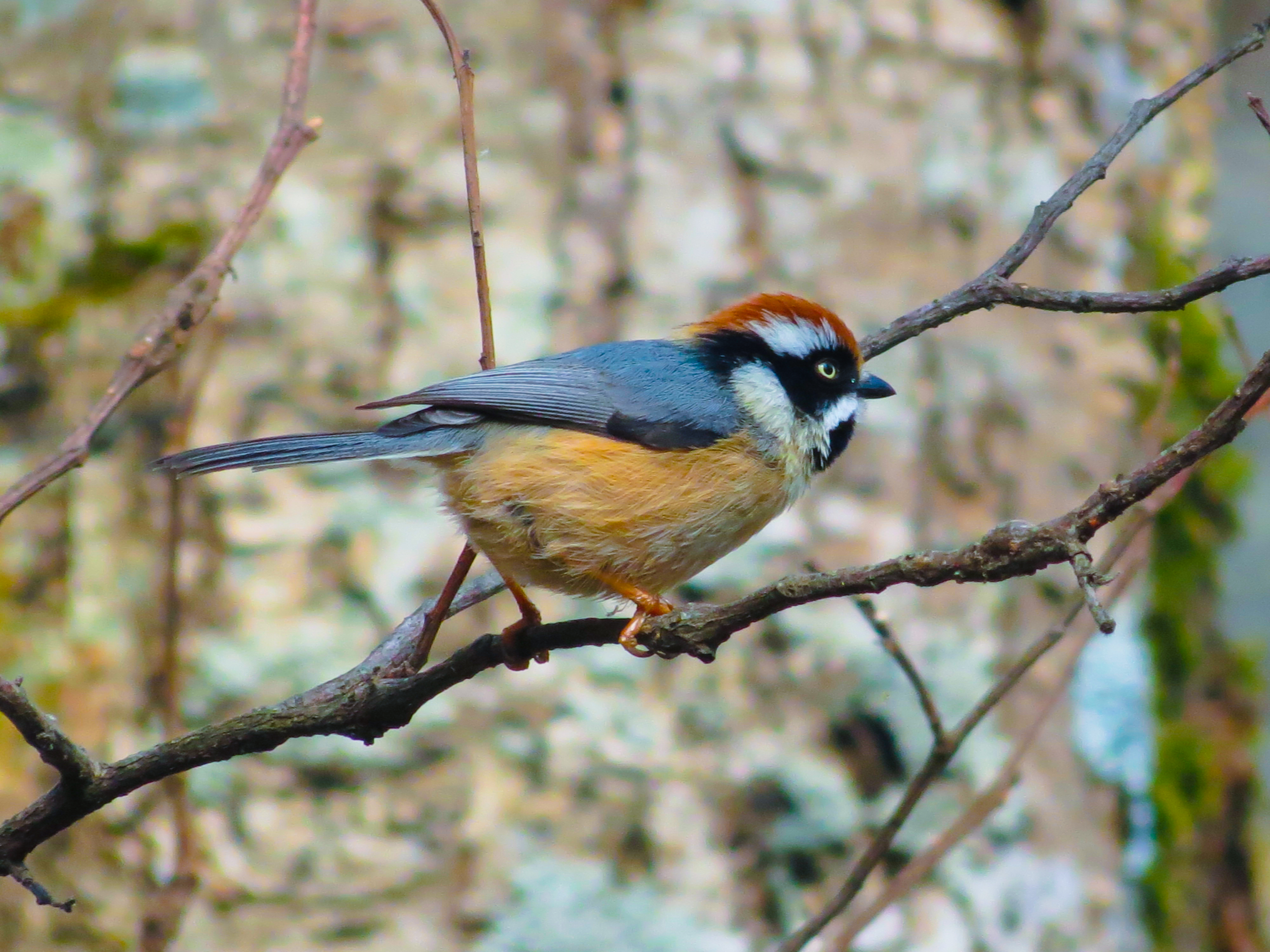
- Black-throated bushtit at Godawari, Nepal

Conservation status
- Least Concern (IUCN 3.1)

Scientific classification
- Kingdom: Animalia
- Phylum: Chordata
- Class: Aves
- Order: Passeriformes
- Family: Aegithalidae
- Genus: Aegithalos
- Species: A. concinnus

Binomial name
- Aegithalos concinnus (Gould, 1855)
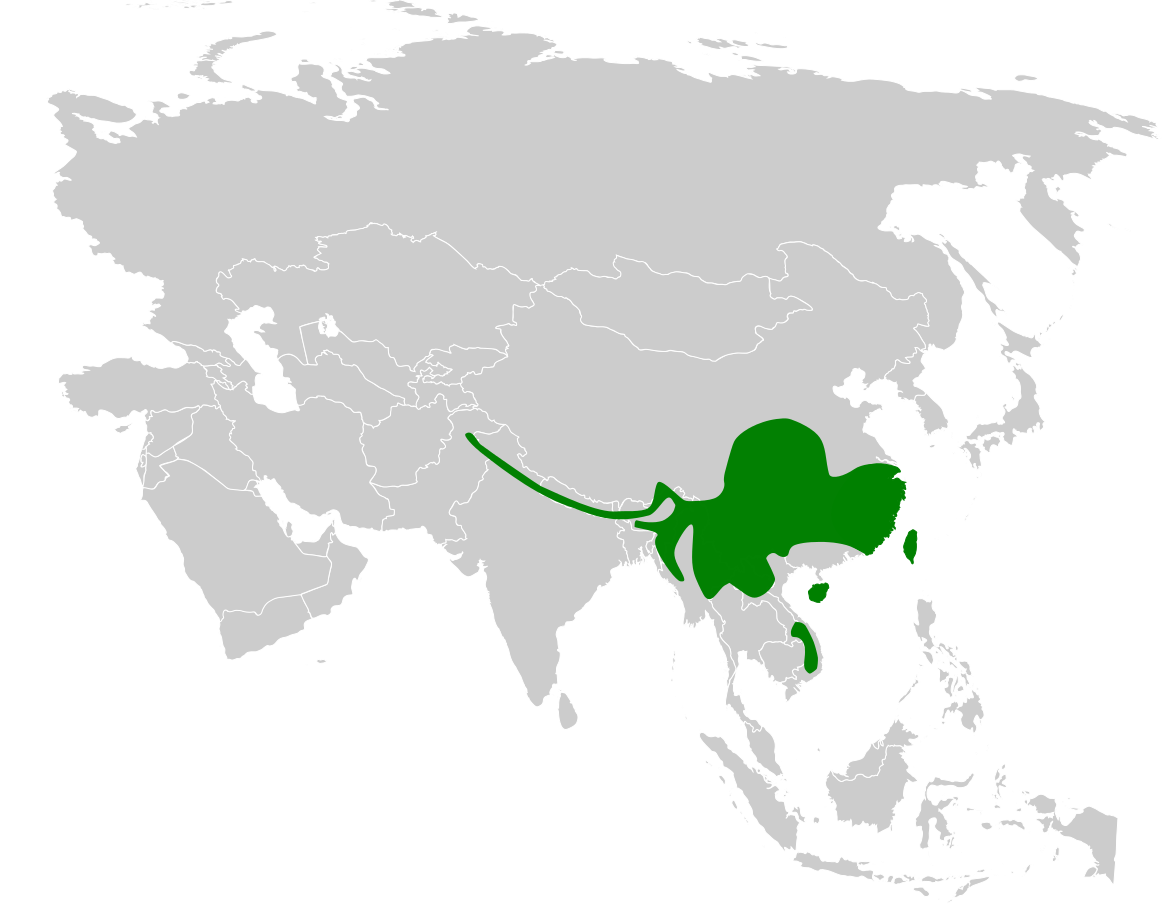

= Black-throated bushtit =

Black-throated tit

Species of bird

In older sources, "black-throated tit" can also mean the rufous-naped tit or the rufous-vented tit, which are true tits.

The black-throated bushtit (Aegithalos concinnus), also known as the black-throated tit, is a very small passerine bird in the family Aegithalidae.

== Taxonomy ==
The species has six currently recognised subspecies, and several others have been suggested. Genetic studies have suggested that these subspecies may represent separate species, but further research is needed.

== Description ==
The black-throated bushtit is a small passerine, around 10.5 cm (4.1 in) long and weighing 4–9 g (0.14–0.32 oz). There is considerable racial variation in the plumage, but all subspecies have a medium length tail (as opposed to the long tail of the related long-tailed tit), a black throat and a black 'bandit mask' around the eye. The nominate race has a chestnut cap, breast band and flanks and dark grey back, wings and tail, and a white belly. The other subspecies have generally the same pattern (minus the chest band) but with grey caps or all grey bellies and flanks. Both sexes are alike.

== Distribution and habitat ==
It ranges from the foothills of the Himalayas, stretching across northern India through north-eastern Bangladesh, Nepal, Bhutan, northern Myanmar, Vietnam, and Taiwan. Disjunct populations also occur in southern Vietnam and eastern Cambodia, on the island of Hainan and further north in China up to the Yellow River. It lives in open broadleaf forest as well as pine forest, generally occurring in middle altitudes.

== Behaviour ==
The black-throated bushtit is highly social and will travel in large flocks of up to 40 birds.

=== Breeding ===
The nest is constructed out of moss and lichen and hangs from the branches of trees.

=== Feeding ===
The species feeds on small insects and spiders, as well as small seeds, fruits and berries (particularly raspberries). Group numbers swell during the non-breeding season, but smaller groups exist year round. These groups will often join mixed-species feeding flocks.

== Gallery ==
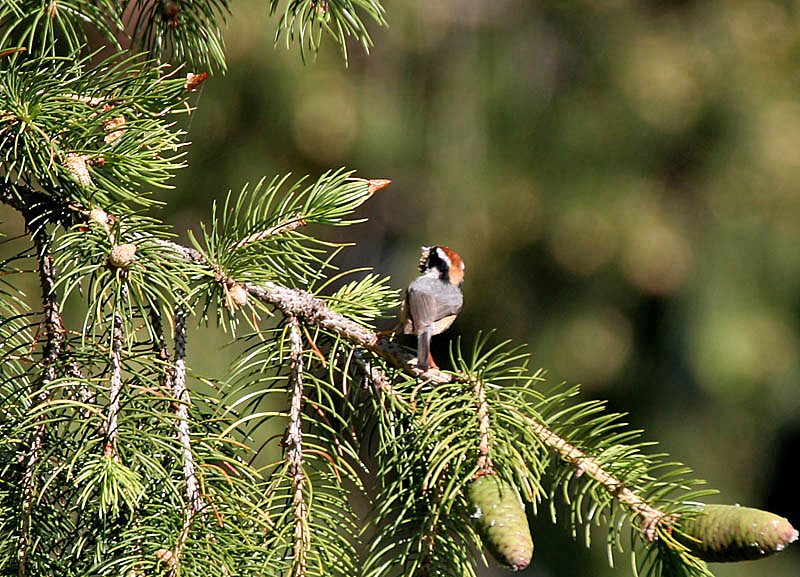
At West Himalayan Fir carrying feed for chicks in Kullu-Manali District. of Himachal Pradesh, India.

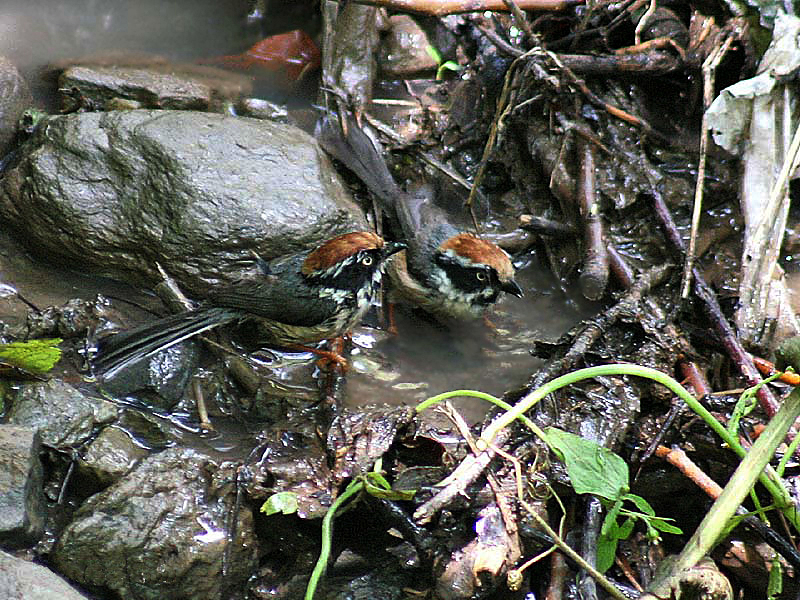
Bathing in Kullu- Manali District of Himachal Pradesh, India.

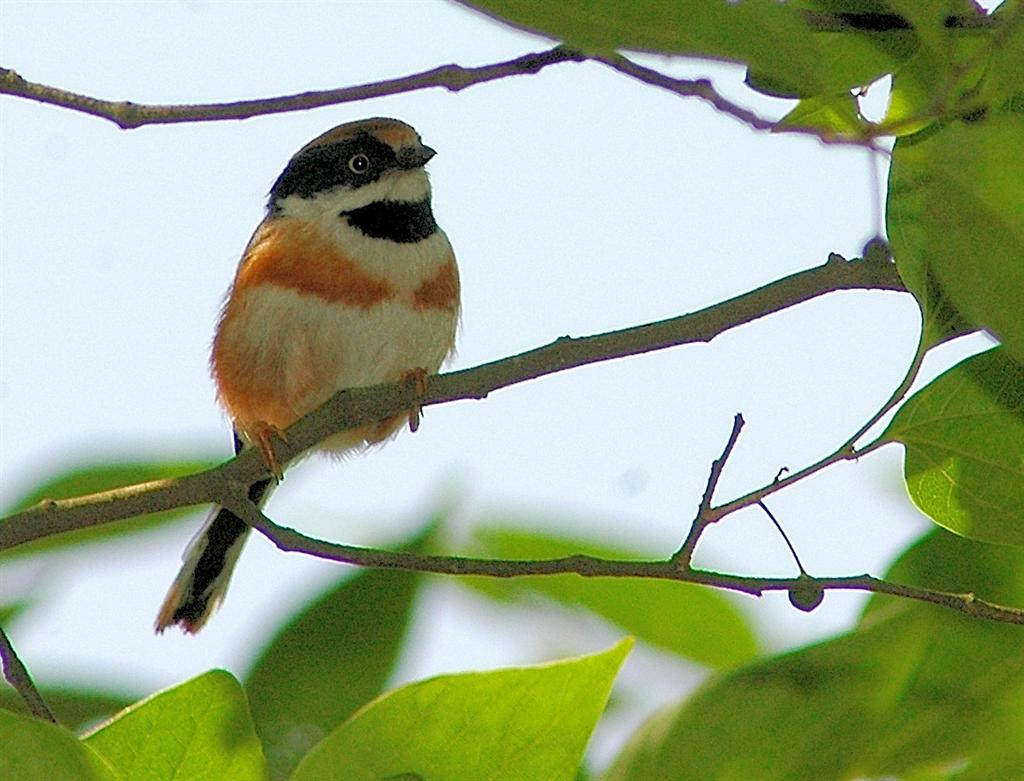
Perching on a branch

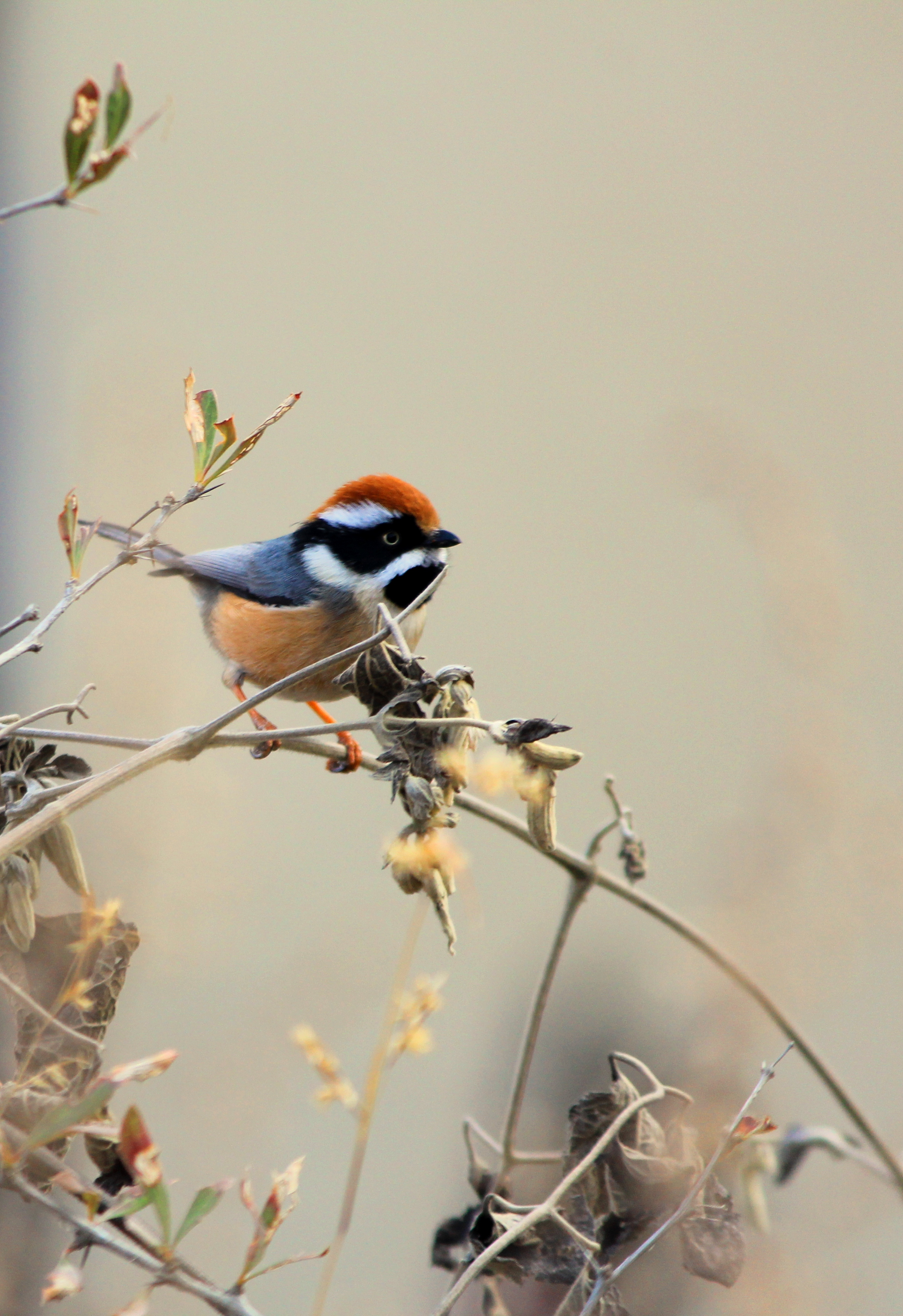
Black-throated bushtit Scientific name: Aegithalos concinnus Theog Forest Division Shimla H.P.
