= Octavius Pickard-Cambridge =

English clergyman and zoologist (1828–1917)

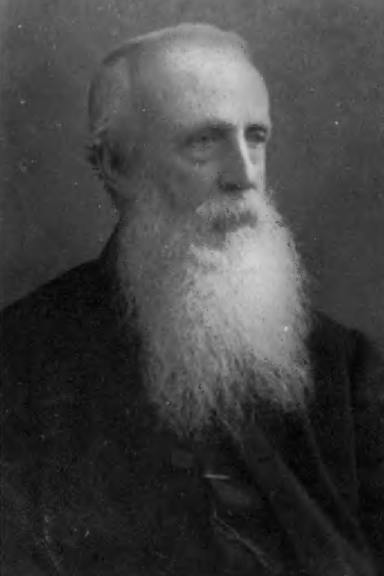
- The Rev. O. Pickard-Cambridge, around 1891
- Born: Octavius Pickard; 3 November 1828; Bloxworth, Dorset, England
- Died: 9 March 1917 (aged 88)
- Education: University of Durham
- Occupations: Clergyman and zoologist
- Spouse: Rose Wallace
- Scientific career
- Author abbrev. (zoology): Pickard-Cambridge

Octavius Pickard-Cambridge FRS (3 November 1828 – 9 March 1917) was an English clergyman and zoologist. He was a keen arachnologist who described and named more than 900 species of spider from a large collection that he made with contributions sent to him by correspondents from around the world.

== Life and work ==
Pickard-Cambridge was born in Bloxworth rectory, Dorset, the fifth son of Rev. George Pickard, rector and squire of Bloxworth: the family changed its name to Pickard-Cambridge in 1848 after receiving the property left behind by a relative, Charles Owen Cambridge, of Whitminster House in Gloucestershire. Octavius was tutored at home by the poet William Barnes, after failing to receive admission to Winchester College. He also learned to play the violin from Sidney Smith. He then studied law in London before theology at the University of Durham. He was very active and made many friends in this period. He served as steward at steeplechases and presided over the college choral society. In 1857 he presented the Pickard-Cambridge Challenge Cup to University College Boating Club, University of Durham for a skiff race; it was re-presented in 1895 for college second trial fours. He received a BA in 1858 and an MA in 1859. He was ordained Deacon at Scarisbrick in 1858. In 1859 he became a priest and resigned the next year to return to Bloxworth succeeding his father in 1868. He took part in debates on evolution and sided with Charles Darwin's views. He corresponded with Darwin on various matters, and with Alfred Russel Wallace, who quoted one of his letters on his 1889 book Darwinism.

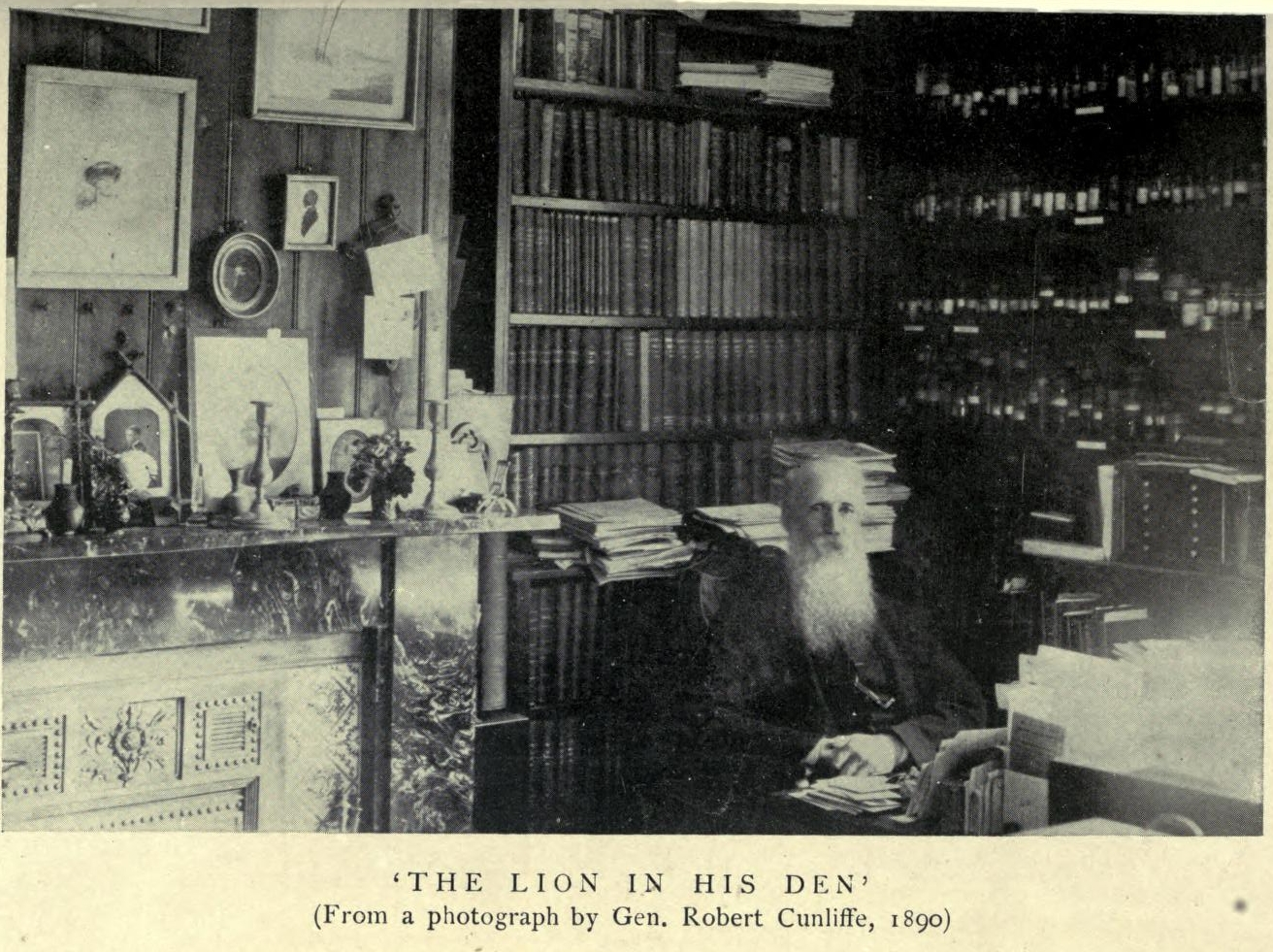
In his study in 1890

Pickard-Cambridge was interested in natural history from an early age and his first publication was made in 1853 in The Zoologist. His main interest was in spiders, though he wrote also on birds and lepidoptera (butterflies and moths). This passion for arachnids was probably fostered in 1854 in which year he both accompanied the entomologist Frederick Bond on a visit to the New Forest in Hampshire and was introduced to the writings of the arachnologist John Blackwall, with whom he struck up a correspondence, meeting for the first time in 1860. Pickard-Cambridge assisted Blackwall between 1861 and 1864 in the publication of Blackwell's great work, British and Irish Spiders. In 1863-64, Pickard-Cambridge travelled through Europe to Egypt along as a tutor for O. Bradshaw. It was on this trip that he met his future wife. He also collected birds in Egypt and began a communication with Alfred Newton, introduced by Frederick Bond. He travelled again in 1865 with Bradshaw, this time meeting Herrich-Schäffer in Regensburg and in Nurenberg, he met Ludwig Koch and spent several days examining the spider collections made by him and his father.

Pickard-Cambridge published extensively on spiders between 1859 and his death in 1917, his major work being the volume on arachnids in the Biologia Centrali-Americana between 1883 and 1902. Of his other works, The Spiders of Dorset was perhaps his best-known, much of his other writing being in the form of papers in The Zoologist, the journals of the Linnean Society and the Zoological Society, and in the Proceedings of the Dorset Natural History and Antiquarian Field Club. He became a world authority on spiders, describing 932 new species including the Costa Rican redleg tarantula (Megaphobema mesomelas) and the Sydney funnel-web spider (Atrax robustus).

Pickard-Cambridge married Rose Wallace on 19 April 1866 after meeting her when she was travelling through Europe with an aunt and sister. He first saw her in Paris where Pickard-Cambridge was tutoring a pupil, though he did not speak to her there, and they were finally introduced in Venice. They had had six sons. Among them were the classicist and composer William Adair Pickard-Cambridge (1879–1957) and the classicist Sir Arthur Wallace Pickard-Cambridge (1873–1952), one of the greatest authorities on the Greek theatre in the first half of the 20th century. Octavius' nephew, Frederick Octavius Pickard-Cambridge (1860–1905), was also a noted arachnologist.

He was elected a Fellow of the Royal Society on 9 September 1887. On his death, his collection made of about 5000 bottles of specimens and his library were bequeathed to the University of Oxford and is now held by Oxford University Museum of Natural History.

== Works ==
- "Arachnida", in Encyclopædia Britannica, 9th Edition, Volume II (Edinburgh, 1875)
- The Spiders of Dorset: From the 'Proceedings of the Dorset Natural History and Antiquarian Field Club.' (Sherbourne, 1879–82)
- Araneidea. Scientific Results of the Second Yarkand Mission. (Calcutta, 1885)
- Monograph of the British Phalangidea or Harvest-Men. (Dorchester, 1890)

== Other sources ==
- Castellum 2006: alumnus newsletter of the University College, Durham. Contains an article entitled 'It's squirrels for luncheon, Sir' (pp. 38–47) with extensive biographical notes and images.
- Pickard-Cambridge, Arthur Wallace, Sir (1918). Memoir of the Reverend Octavius Pickard-Cambridge. Oxford: Printed for private circulation.
- "Obituary Notices of Fellows Deceased". Proceedings of the Royal Society of London. Series B, Containing Papers of a Biological Character. 91 (641). Royal Society: i–liii. 15 November 1920. JSTOR 80995.
- Biography of Octavius Pickard-Cambridge at the S2A3 Biographical Database of Southern African Science
