= William Lucas Distant =

British entomologist (1845–1922)

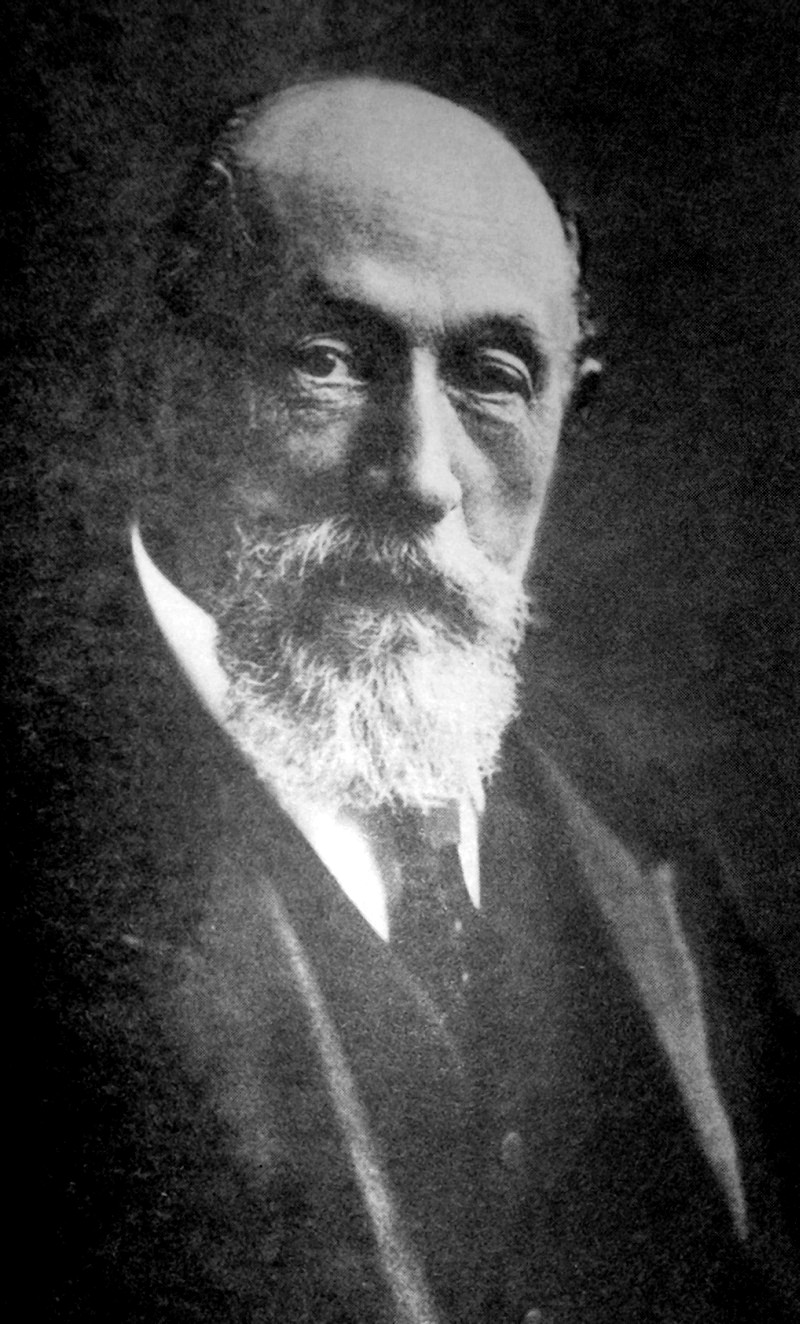
- Born: 12 November 1845; Rotherhithe
- Died: 4 February 1922 (aged 76); Wanstead, England
- Occupation: Entomologist
- Spouse: Edith Blanche de Rubain

William Lucas Distant (12 November 1845 Rotherhithe – 4 February 1922 Wanstead) was an English entomologist.

== Biography ==
=== Early years ===
Distant was born in Rotherhithe, the son of whaling captain Alexander Distant and his wife, Sarah Ann Distant (née Berry).

Following his father's death in 1867, a trip to the Malay Peninsula to visit his older brother, also named Alexander and a ship's captain, aroused his interest in natural history, and resulted in the publication of Rhopalocera Malayana (1882–1886), a description of the butterflies of the Malay Peninsula. (He considered 5 August 1867 as the most eventful day in his life).

=== Career ===
Much of Distant's early life was spent working in a London tannery, and while employed there he made two long visits to the Transvaal. The first resulted in the publication of A Naturalist in the Transvaal (1892). The second visit, of some four years, gave him time to amass a large collection of insects, of which many were described in Insecta Transvaaliensia (1900–1911). In 1890 he married Edith Blanche de Rubain.

In 1897 he succeeded James Edmund Harting as editor of The Zoologist. He was editor for eighteen years, until the end of 1914, and saw "the substitution of the camera for the gun, more especially among ornithologists." The last two volumes of the journal were edited by Frank Finn. At the end of 1916 The Zoologist amalgamated with British Birds (founded 1908).

From 1899 to 1920 he was employed by the Natural History Museum, describing many new species found in their collection, and devoting most of his time to the "Rhynchota" (a former grouping within true bugs).

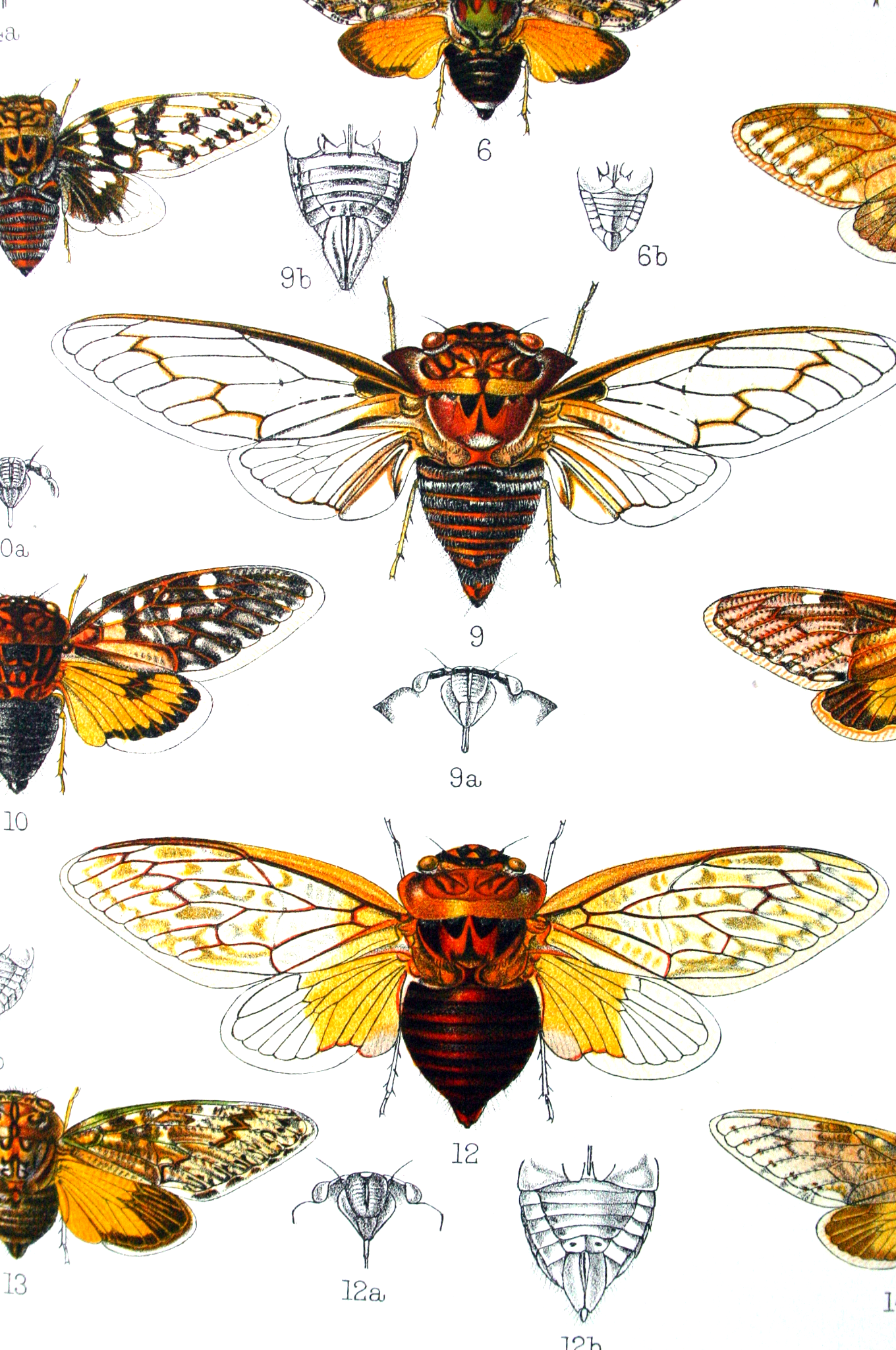
Part of plate XVII from Insecta Transvaaliensia

His other works included Volume I of the Heteroptera and part of Volume I of the Homoptera of the Biologia Centrali-Americana (1880–1900), and the Hemiptera volumes of The Fauna of British India, Including Ceylon and Burma (1902–1918).

=== Later life ===
Distant's collection of 50,000 specimens was purchased by the Natural History Museum in 1920. He died of cancer at Wanstead.

== Legacy ==
Distant is commemorated in the scientific names of more than 15 animal genera, and well over 100 species, almost exclusively among Hemiptera.

One lizard is also named after Distant, Agama aculeata distanti (BOULENGER 1902).

== Publications ==
A partial list of works is as follows.

- 1902-1918: The Fauna of British India, Including Ceylon and Burma. (Rhynchota volumes 1–7)
- 1900-1911: Insecta Transvaaliensia: A Contribution to the Entomology of South Africa.
- A Naturalist in the Transvaal
- A Monograph of Oriental Cicadidae
- Rhopalocera Malayana: A Description of the Butterflies of the Malay Peninsula
- Biologia Centrali-Americana: Insecta Rhynchota Hemiptera-Heteroptera
- Rhynchotal Notes: Membracidae
- Rhynchota from New Caledonia and the Surrounding Islands in Fritz Sarasin and Jean Roux's Nova Caledonia: Forschungen in NeuCalodonien und auf den Loyalty-Inslen – Recherches scientifiques en Nouvelle Calédonie et aux Iles Loyalty
- A Synonymic Catalogue of Homoptera
- 1912: Homoptera: fam. Cicadidae: subfam. Cicadinae.
- Scientific Results of the Second Yarkand Mission: Based Upon the Collections and Notes of the Late Ferdinand Stoliczka: Rhynchota
