= Long-tailed tit =

- A. c. caudatus in Moscow Oblast, Russia

Conservation status
- Least Concern (IUCN 3.1)

Scientific classification
- Kingdom: Animalia
- Phylum: Chordata
- Class: Aves
- Order: Passeriformes
- Family: Aegithalidae
- Genus: Aegithalos
- Species: A. caudatus

Binomial name
- Aegithalos caudatus (Linnaeus, 1758)

Subspecies
- See text
- Range of A. caudatus Resident Non-breeding

Synonyms
- Parus caudatus Linnaeus, 1758

Audio
- Calls recorded in Cambridgeshire (Eurasian blue tit also audible)

Species of bird in Europe and Asia

The long-tailed tit or long-tailed bushtit (Aegithalos caudatus) is a common bird species belonging to the bushtit family found throughout Eurasia. An insectivore, it inhabits deciduous and mixed woodlands as well as scrub, heathland, farmland, parks and gardens. The plumage of this small long-tailed bird is predominantly black and white with varying amounts of pink and grey. Northern subspecies are paler and have completely white heads, lacking the large dark eyebrows of southern populations. It is a social bird that forms compact family flocks of six to seventeen individuals outside of the breeding season, when these flocks break up. It has a strong preference for nesting in scrub areas and often builds its nest in thorny bushes less than 3 metres (10 feet) above the ground.

== Taxonomy and systematics ==
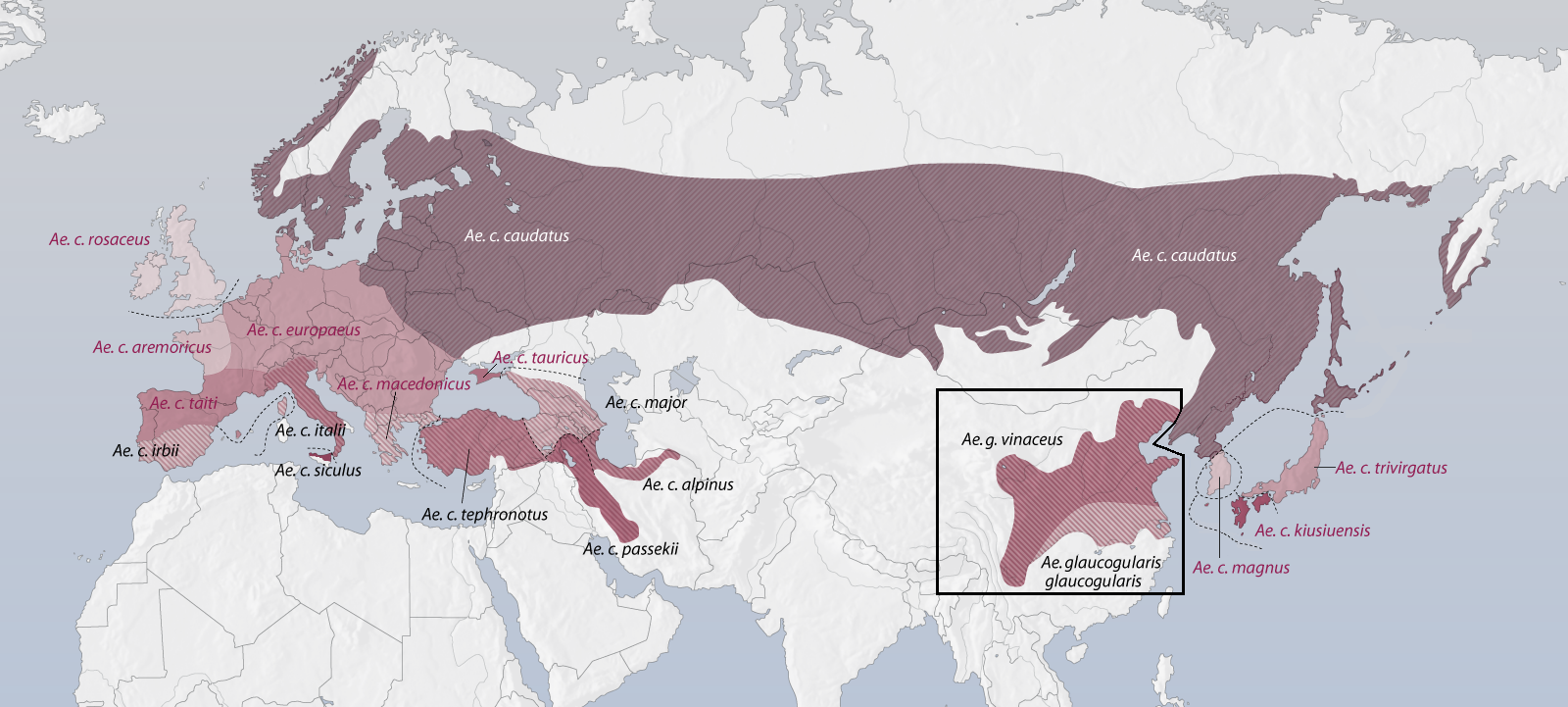
Distribution map of long-tailed tit subspecies

The long-tailed tit was formally described by the Swedish naturalist Carl Linnaeus in 1758 in the tenth edition of his Systema Naturae under the binomial name Parus caudatus. The current genus name Aegithalos was a term used by Aristotle for some European tits, including the long-tailed tit. The specific epithet caudatus is the Latin word for "tailed". Linnaeus did not invent this Latin name. "Parus caudatus" had been used by earlier authors such as the Swiss naturalist Conrad Gessner in 1555, the Italian naturalist Ulisse Aldrovandi in 1599, and the English ornithologist Francis Willughby in 1676. Willughby listed the English name as the "long tail'd titmouse". Thomas's claim that a previous common nickname in everyday English was the bum-towel, from the shape of its tail is not well-attested.

The long-tailed tit was originally classified as a true tit of the genus Parus. Since then, it and its relatives have been reclassified as a distinct family, the Aegithalidae, containing three genera. This species is the only representative of the family Aegithalidae found in northern Eurasia. The long-tailed tit exhibits complex global variation with 17 subspecies recognised; these were formerly divided into three groups, the A. c. caudatus group in northern Europe and Asia, the A. c. europaeus group in southern and western Europe, north-east China, and Japan, and the A. c. alpinus group in Mediterranean Europe and south-west Asia; however, the current subspecies order given in the Avilist, followed below, does not use these groupings, instead grouping all the European subspecies first and the east Asian subspecies following.

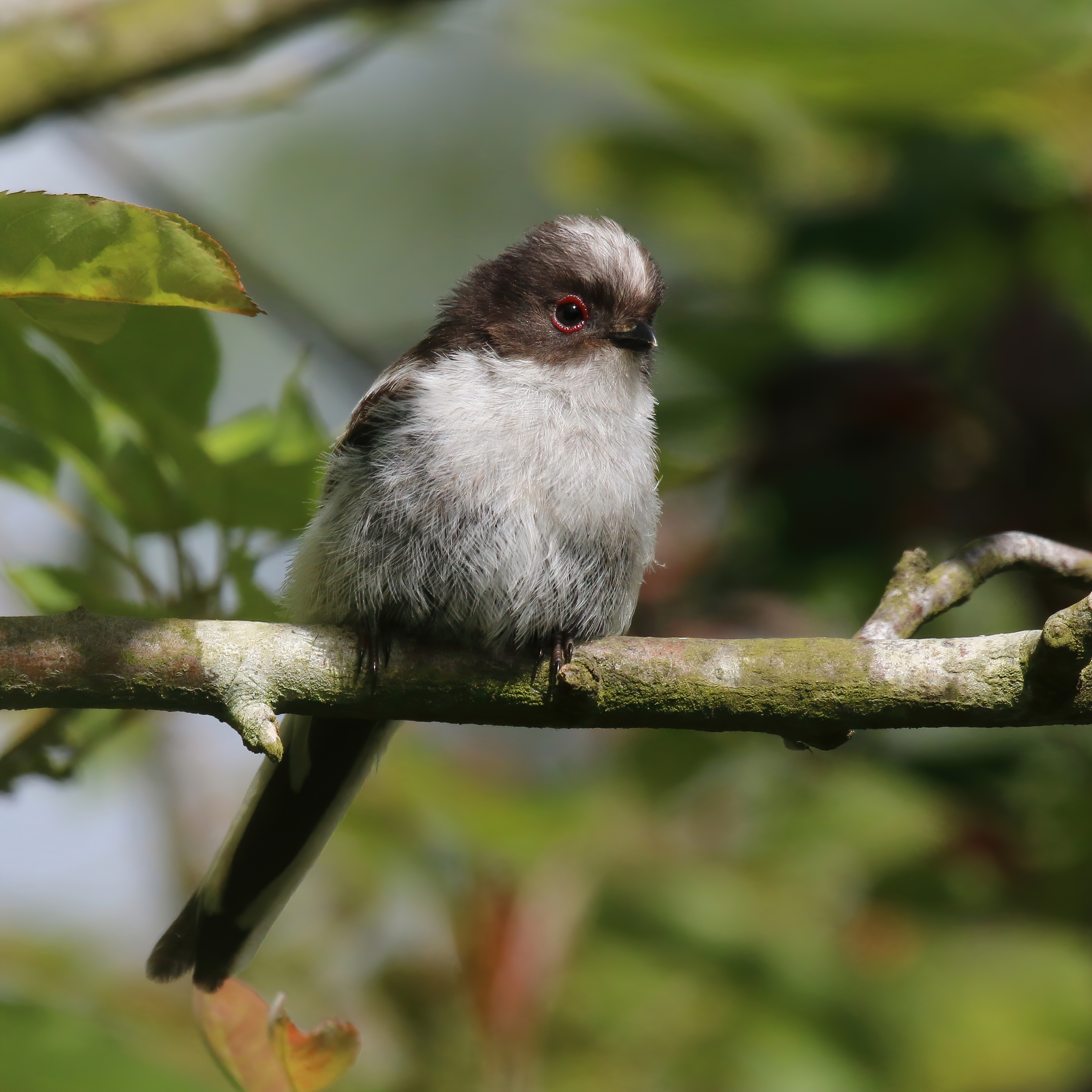
Juveniles of all subspecies (here, A. c. rosaceus) have a diffuse, broad dark eyestripe

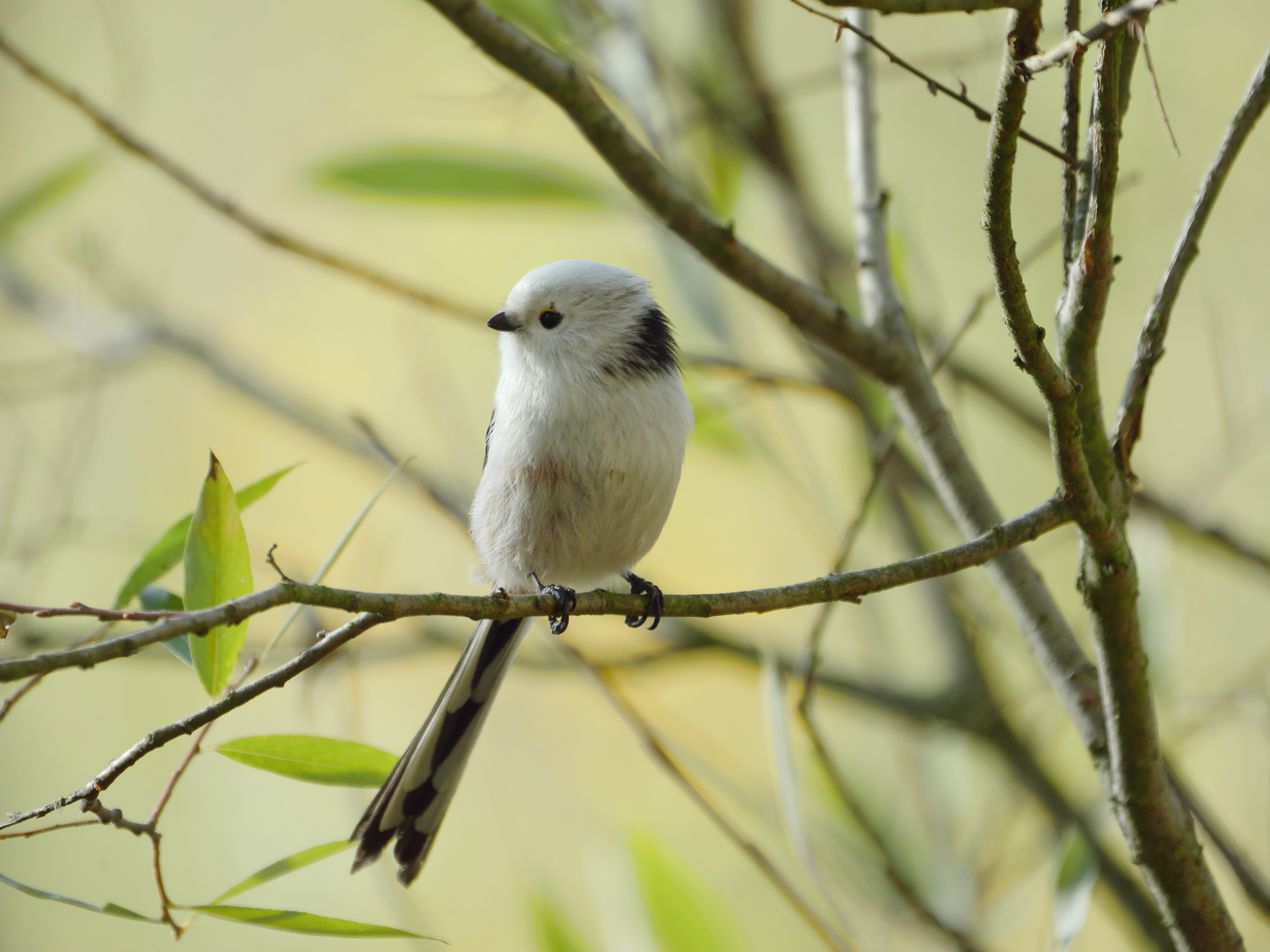
Aegithalos caudatus caudatus with white head in Berlin

Image	Scientific name	Notes	Distribution
	Aegithalos caudatus caudatus (Linnaeus, 1758)	Pure white head	Scandinavia and northern and eastern Europe and northern Asia, from Norway south to northern Ukraine and east to Kamchatka and Hokkaido (Japan).
	Aegithalos caudatus rosaceus Mathews, 1938	Separation from A. c. europaeus and A. c. aremoricus is problematic, relying on varying thickness of the crown stripes and amount of streaks and colour on the underparts	Ireland and Great Britain
	Aegithalos caudatus europaeus (Hermann, 1804)		Central and eastern France and Germany to northern Italy, western Romania, and northern Bulgaria
	Aegithalos caudatus aremoricus Whistler, 1929		Northwestern France, Channel Islands, and Île d'Yeu (off western France)
	Aegithalos caudatus taiti Ingram, W, 1913	Dark, with broad black eyebrow	Southern and southwestern France to northwestern Spain and northern Portugal
	Aegithalos caudatus irbii (Sharpe & Dresser, 1871)	Grey with almost no pink tones except weakly on the flanks	Southern Spain, southern Portugal, and Corsica
	Aegithalos caudatus italiae Jourdain, 1910	Forecrown often brownish contrasting with white crown stripe; broad, dark eyebrow	Mainland Italy (except far north in Alps) and southwestern Slovenia
	Aegithalos caudatus siculus (Whitaker, 1901)	Broad, but brownish, eyebrow; pale; shorter tail	Sicily (endemic)
	Aegithalos caudatus macedonicus (Salvadori & Dresser, 1892)	Plumage similar to A. c. europaeus, but averages slightly smaller and shorter-tailed	Balkans
	Aegithalos caudatus tephronotus (Gunther, 1865)	Very grey, lacking in pink tones	Turkey
	Aegithalos caudatus tauricus (Menzbier, 1903)		Southern Crimea
	Aegithalos caudatus major (Radde, 1884)		Caucasus to western and central Transcaucasia
	Aegithalos caudatus alpinus (Hablizl, 1783)		Southeastern Azerbaijan to northern Iran and southwestern Turkmenistan
	Aegithalos caudatus passekii (Zarudny, 1904)		Southwestern Iran (Zagros Mountains)
	Aegithalos caudatus trivirgatus (Temminck & Schlegel, 1848)	Similar plumage pattern to A. c. europaeus, but cleaner colours and purer white underparts	Central Japan (Honshu, Awa-shima, Sado, and Oki); Korea (Jeju Island)
	Aegithalos caudatus kiusiuensis Kuroda & Nagamichi, 1923		Southern Japan (Shikoku, Kyushu, and Yakushima)
	Aegithalos caudatus magnus (Clark, AH, 1907)		Southern Korea and Tsushima Islands (Kamino-shima and Shimono-shima)

Where the subspecies meet, there are extensive areas occupied by variable intergrades.

The silver-throated bushtit (Aegithalos glaucogularis) from eastern China was formerly considered conspecific with the long-tailed tit, but was later split due to significant plumage and genetic differences.

== Description ==
This species has been described as a tiny (at only 13–15 cm (5–6 in) in length, including its 7–9 cm (3–3 1/2 in) tail), round-bodied tit-like bird with a short, stubby bill and a very long, narrow tail. The sexes look the same and young birds undergo a complete moult to adult plumage before the first winter. The plumage is mainly black and white, with variable amounts of grey and pink.

=== Voice ===
This species is often identified in the field through hearing its distinctive vocalisations. When they are in flocks, they issue constant contact calls, so they are often heard before they are seen. They have three main calls, a single high pitched pit, a 'triple trill' eez-eez-eez, and a rattling schnuur. These calls become faster and louder when the birds cross open ground or if an individual becomes separated from the group.

== Distribution and habitat ==
The long-tailed tit is widespread throughout temperate Northern Europe and the Palearctic region, extending into the boreal Scandinavia and south into the Mediterranean zone. It inhabits deciduous and mixed woodlands with a well-developed shrub layer and favours edge habitats. It can also be found in scrubland, heathland with scattered trees, bushes and hedges, farmland, riverine woodland, and parks and gardens. The bird's year-round diet of insects and its social foraging behaviour influence its choice of habitat in winter, which is typically deciduous woodland with a canopy of oak, ash and locally sycamore species. For nesting, a strong preference is shown for scrub areas. The nest is often built in thorny bushes less than 3 metres (10 feet) above the ground.

== Behaviour and ecology ==
=== Migration and dispersal ===
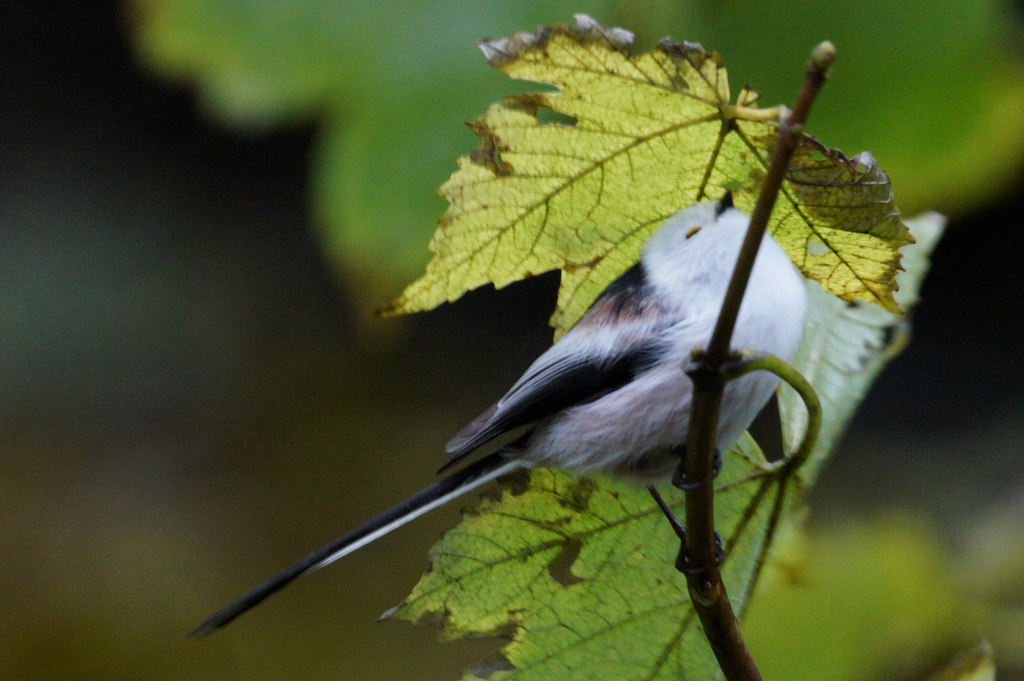
A. c. caudatus as a vagrant in Shetland, a sea crossing of 300 km from the nearest breeding populations in Norway

The long-tailed tit is generally resident, only moving short distances, with the exception of the white-headed northern nominate A. c. caudatus; this is significantly more mobile, with some moving long distances south or west to escape the harsh winters of its breeding range. In Great Britain, recoveries of ringed long-tailed tits showed the median distance travelled was just 2 km. Immatures were more mobile than adults; of recoveries of birds ringed as adults, 95% were within 20 km of the ringing site, while for birds ringed as juveniles, 95% were within 60 km of the ringing site.

=== Food and feeding ===
The long-tailed tit is insectivorous throughout the year. Its diet consists predominantly of arthropods, with a preference for the eggs and larvae of moths and butterflies. It occasionally takes vegetable matter such as seeds in autumn and winter.

=== Nest ===
The nest of the long-tailed tit is constructed from several materials; lichen, feathers, spider egg cocoons, spider silk, and moss, with over 6,000 pieces used for a typical nest. The nest is a flexible sac with a small, round entrance at the top, suspended either low in a gorse or bramble bush or high up in the forks of tree branches. The structural stability of the nest is provided by a mesh of moss and spider silk; the tiny leaves of the moss act as hooks and the spider's silken thread provides the loops, thus producing a natural form of velcro. The tit lines the outside with hundreds of flakes of pale lichens to provide camouflage. The inside of the nest is lined with more than 2,000 downy feathers to provide insulation. The nests suffer a high rate of predation, with only 17% success.

In Britain and Ireland, the first clutch is generally laid between late March and late April and typically contains six to eight eggs. The female alone incubates the eggs for 15–18 days. The altricial young usually remain in the nest for about 16 days before fledging.

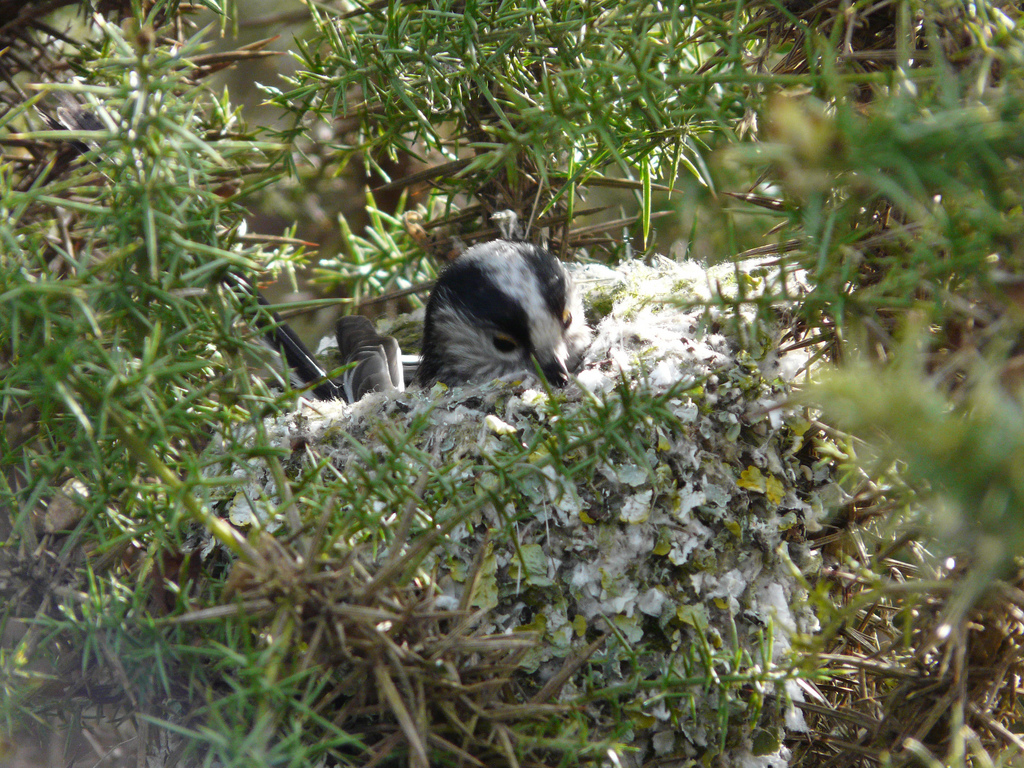
A long-tailed tit in its nest

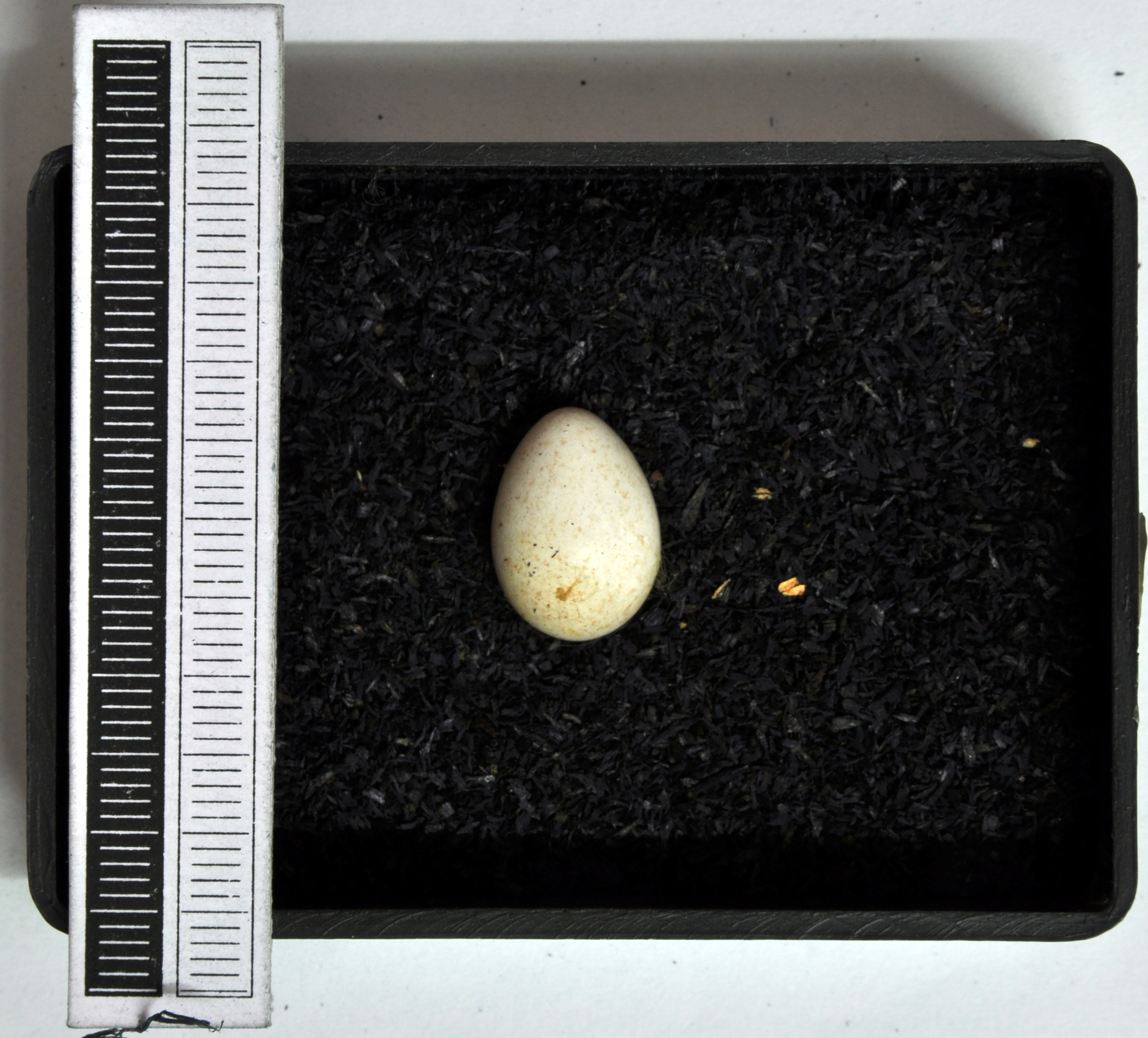
Egg, Collection Museum Wiesbaden

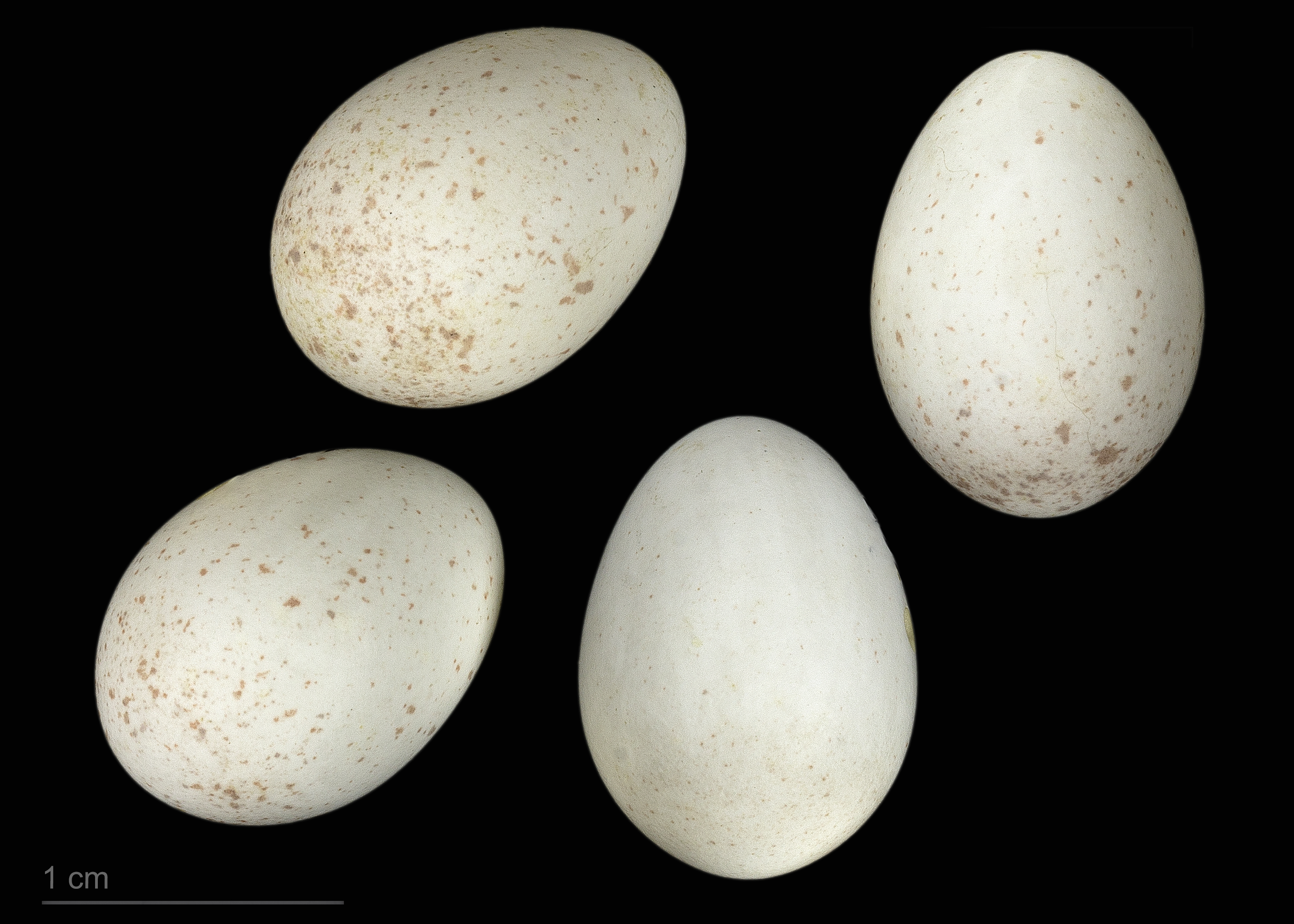
Aegithalos caudatus – MHNT

=== Social behaviour ===
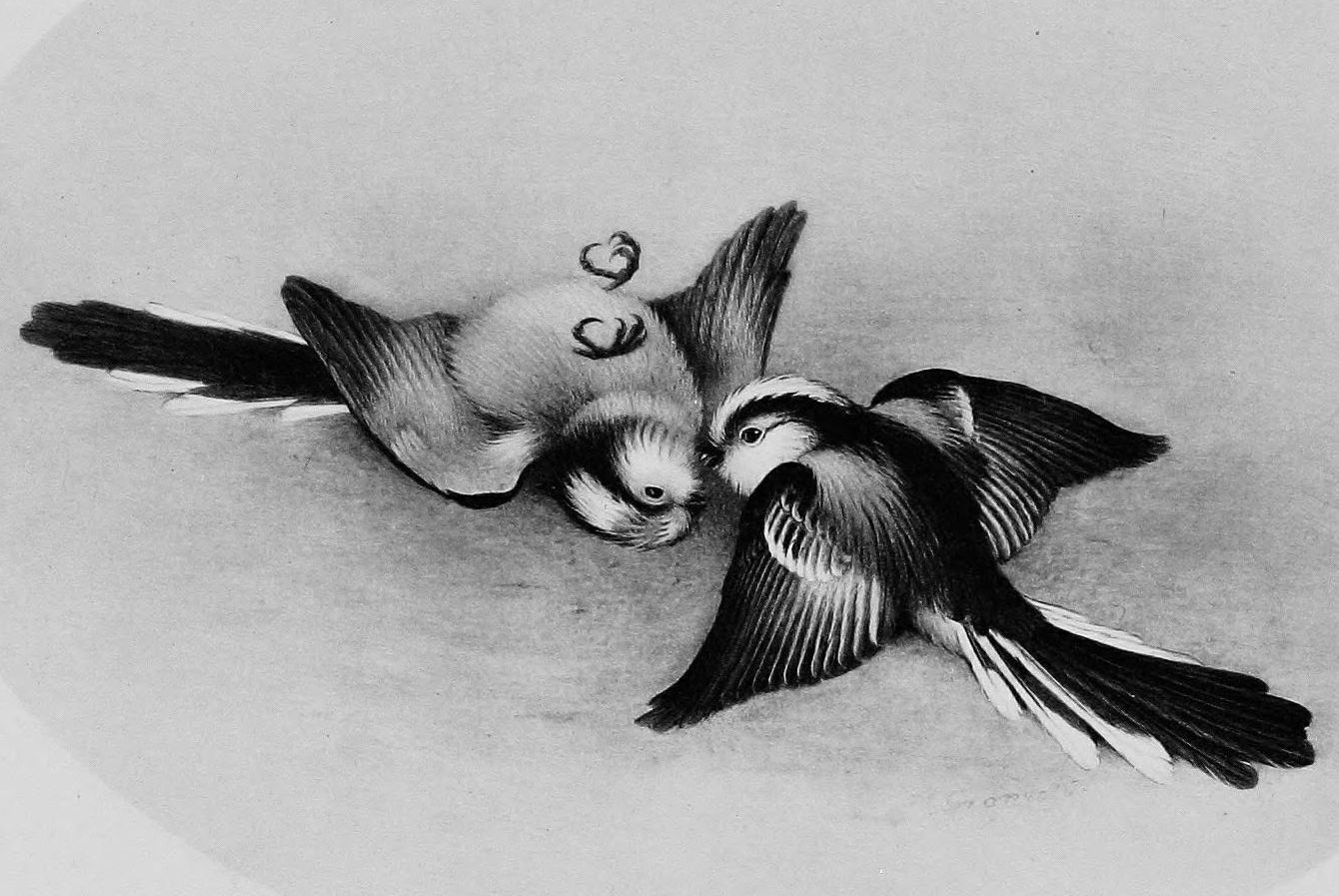
"Males fighting for the possession of territory. The feathers have been torn from the crown of the defeated and dying rival" (H. E. Howard (1920), Territory in Bird Life, p. 145)

Long-tailed tits flying in the trees in Japan, 2026

Outside of the breeding season, long-tailed tits form compact flocks of six to seventeen birds. These flocks are composed of family parties (parents and offspring) from the previous breeding season, along with any additional adults who helped raise a brood. These flocks will occupy and defend territories against neighbouring flocks. The driving force behind the flocking behaviour is thought to be that of winter roosting, being susceptible to cold; huddling increases survival through cold nights. When the breeding season begins, the flocks break up, and the birds attempt to breed in monogamous pairs. Males remain within the winter territory, while females have a tendency to wander to neighbouring territories.

Since long-tailed tits are cooperative breeders, where opposite sex adult relatives are spatially clustered, they risk inbreeding fitness costs. However, such inbreeding fitness costs are avoided by active kin discrimination during mate choice. Kin discrimination appears to be based on distinguishing between the vocal calls of close kin and nonkin.

Pairs whose nests fail have three options: they can try again, abandon nesting for the season, or help at a neighbouring nest. Studies have shown that failed pairs tend to split up and assist with the nest duties of male relatives, recognition being established vocally. The helped nests have greater success due to higher provisioning rates and better nest defence. At the end of the breeding season, in June and July, the birds reform the winter flocks in their winter territory.

=== Helpers ===
There is a high nest failure rate due to high predation. If a nest fails after the beginning of May, the failed breeders will not attempt to re-nest, but they may become helpers at the nest of another pair, who are usually related. One study found that around 50% of nests had one or more helpers. By helping close relatives, helpers indirectly benefit in terms of fitness by increasing the survivability of related offspring. They may also gain greater access to mates and territories in the future. Helpers also gain experience in raising young, meaning that their future offspring have a better chance of survival.

Both males and females are equally likely to become helpers. Parents may supplement their own efforts with the help of others, or, at the other extreme, reduce their own efforts in favour of the helpers' efforts. Although the survival rate for adults of both sexes is the same, juvenile males have a higher survival rate than juvenile females. Offspring raised with helpers have a higher survival rate than those raised without. Failed breeders who became helpers had a higher survival rate than those who did not. This may be due to the reduced energy expenditure involved in sharing a nest. This is similar phenomenon to that observed in acorn woodpeckers and green wood hoopoes. However, failed breeders that did not help are more likely to breed successfully in subsequent years, so there may be a cost of helping. This may be due to helpers having relatively poorer body conditions at the end of the breeding season, similar to pied kingfisher and white-winged chough. Successful breeders have a survivability rate around the survivability of failed breeders who became helpers.

== Status and conservation ==
Globally, the species is common throughout its range, only becoming scarce at the edge of the distribution. The IUCN, BirdLife International and The British Trust for Ornithology (BTO) all list the long-tailed tit as a 'species of least concern', currently under little or no threat and reasonably abundant.

Due to their small size they are vulnerable to extreme cold weather, with population losses of up to 80% being recorded in times of prolonged cold. It is thought that populations rapidly return to previous levels due to high breeding potential.

== Gallery ==
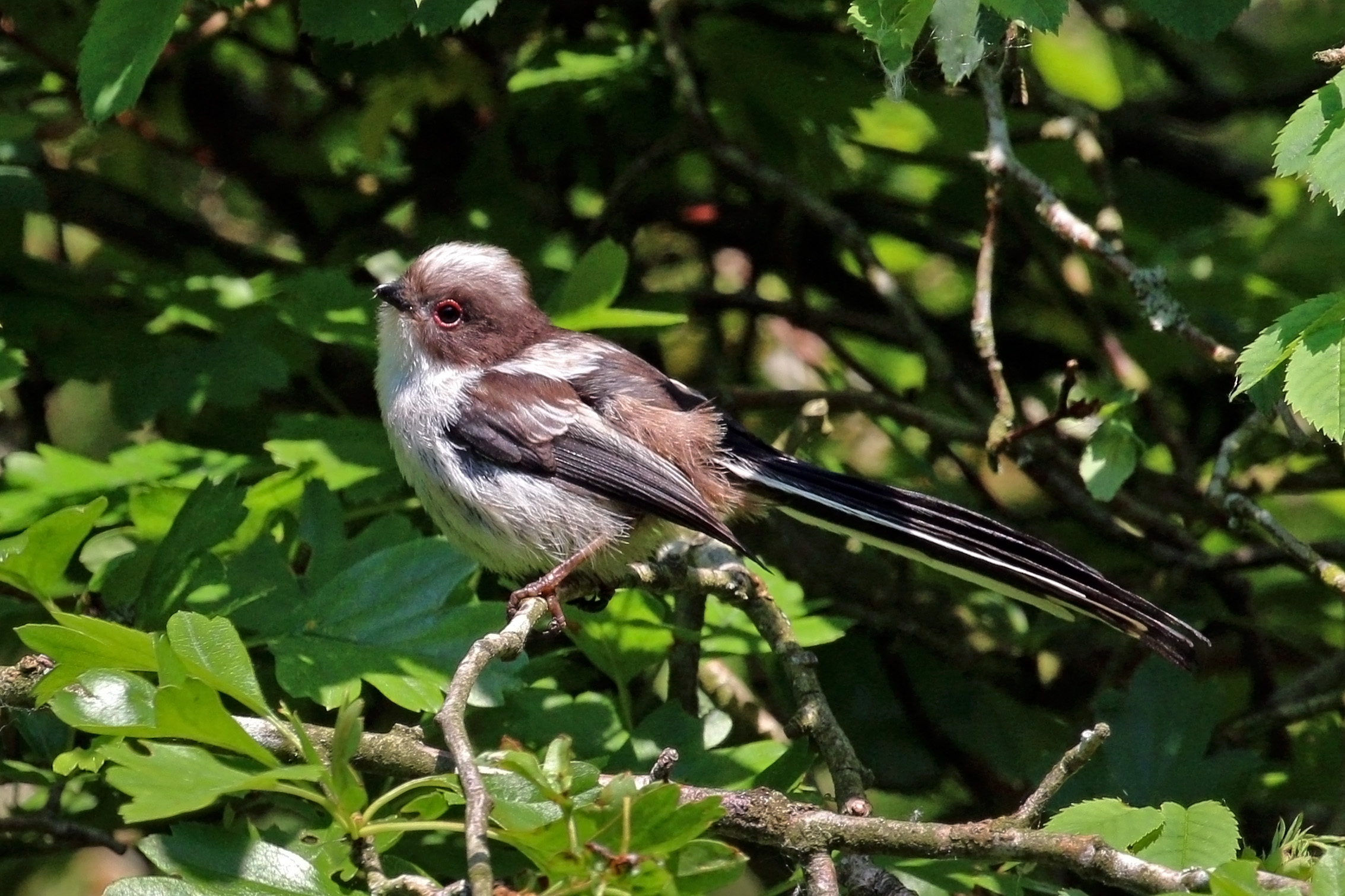
Red eye-ring of juvenile, Oxfordshire

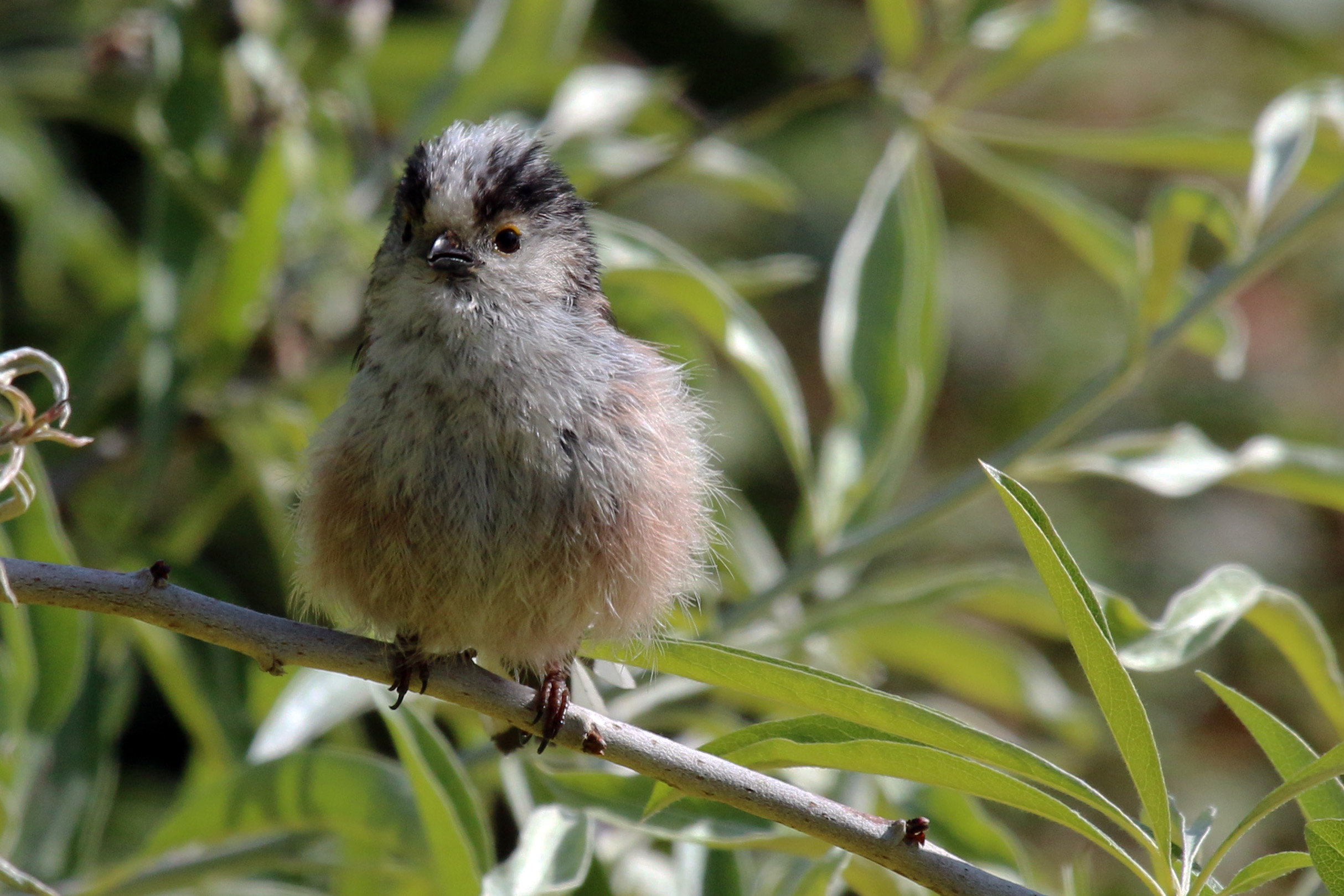
Yellow eye-ring of young bird, Oxfordshire

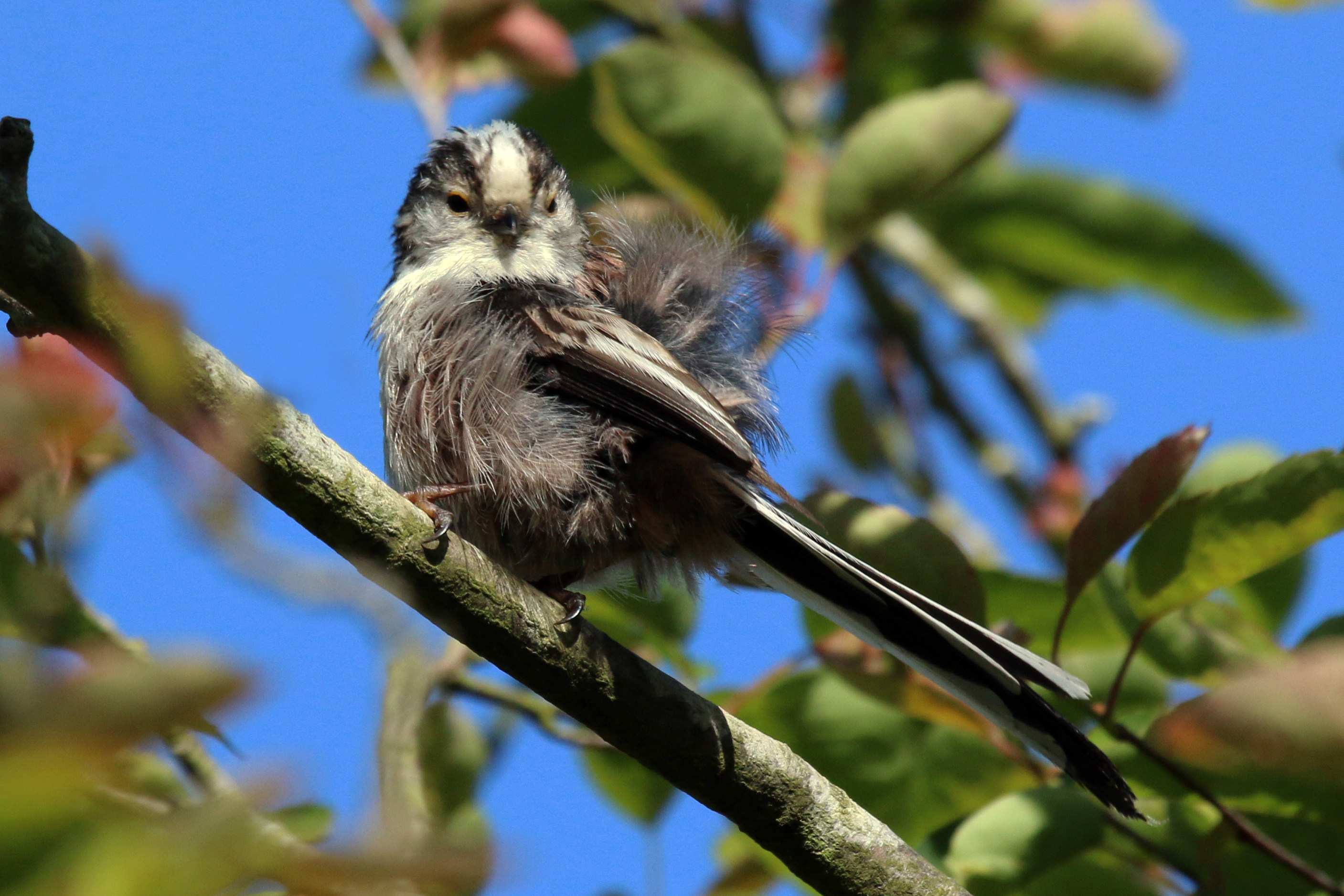
Young adult moulting in Oxfordshire

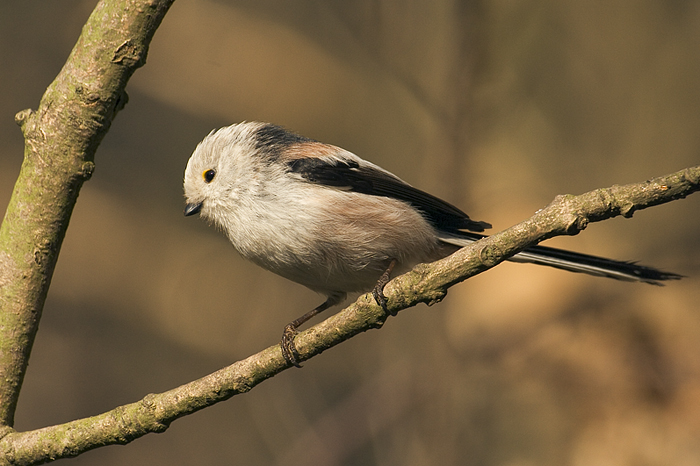
Member of the white-headed subspecies

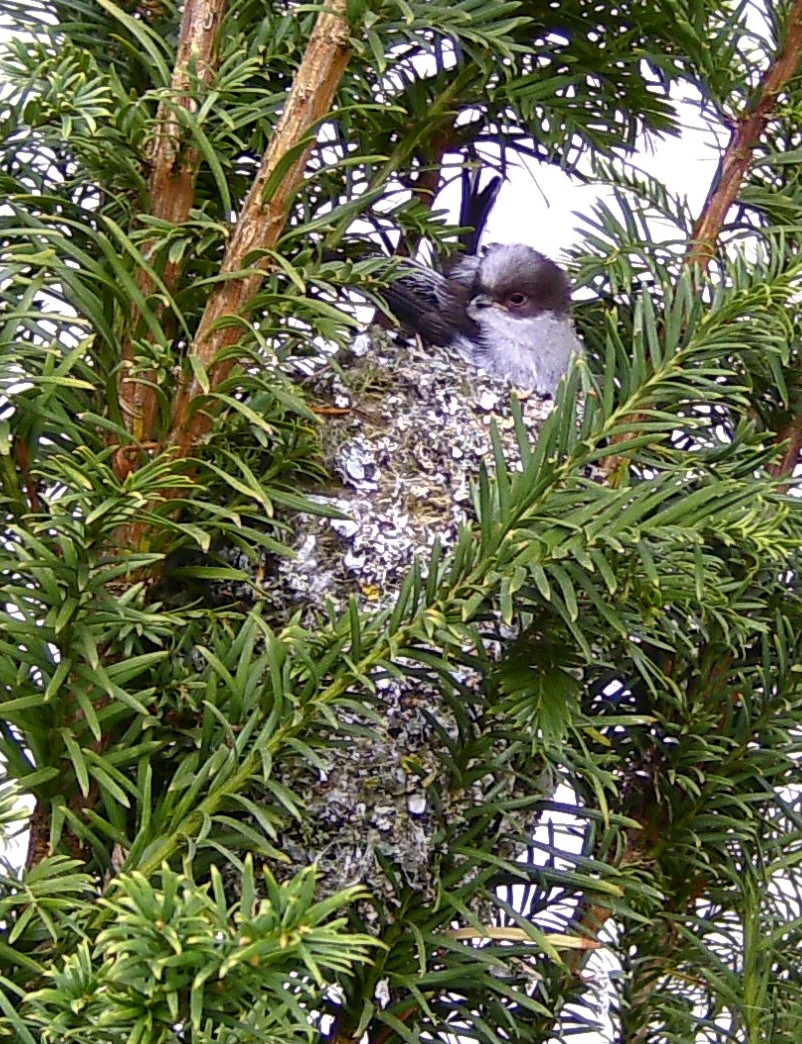
Juvenile on nest

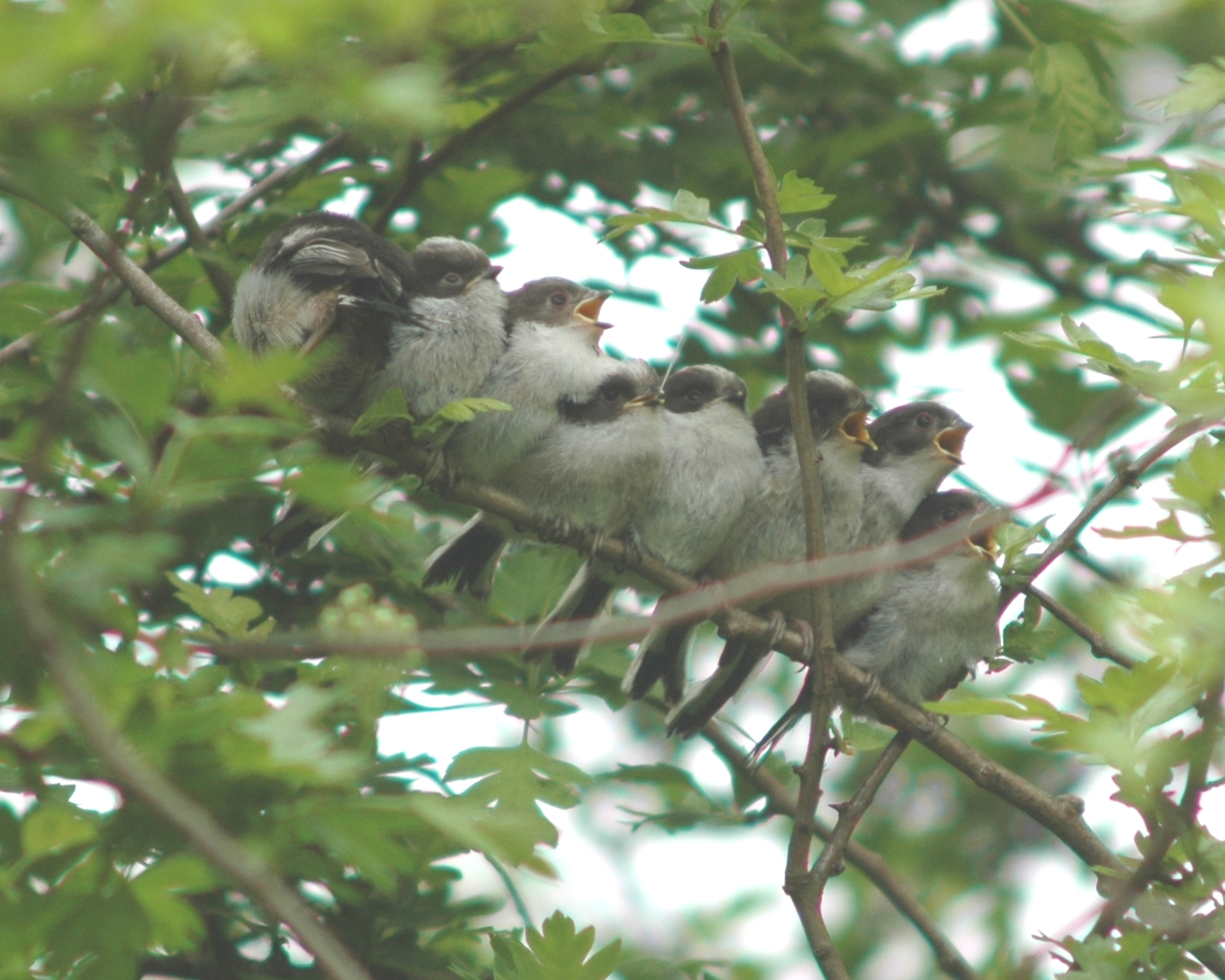
Brood of eight fledglings calling to be fed

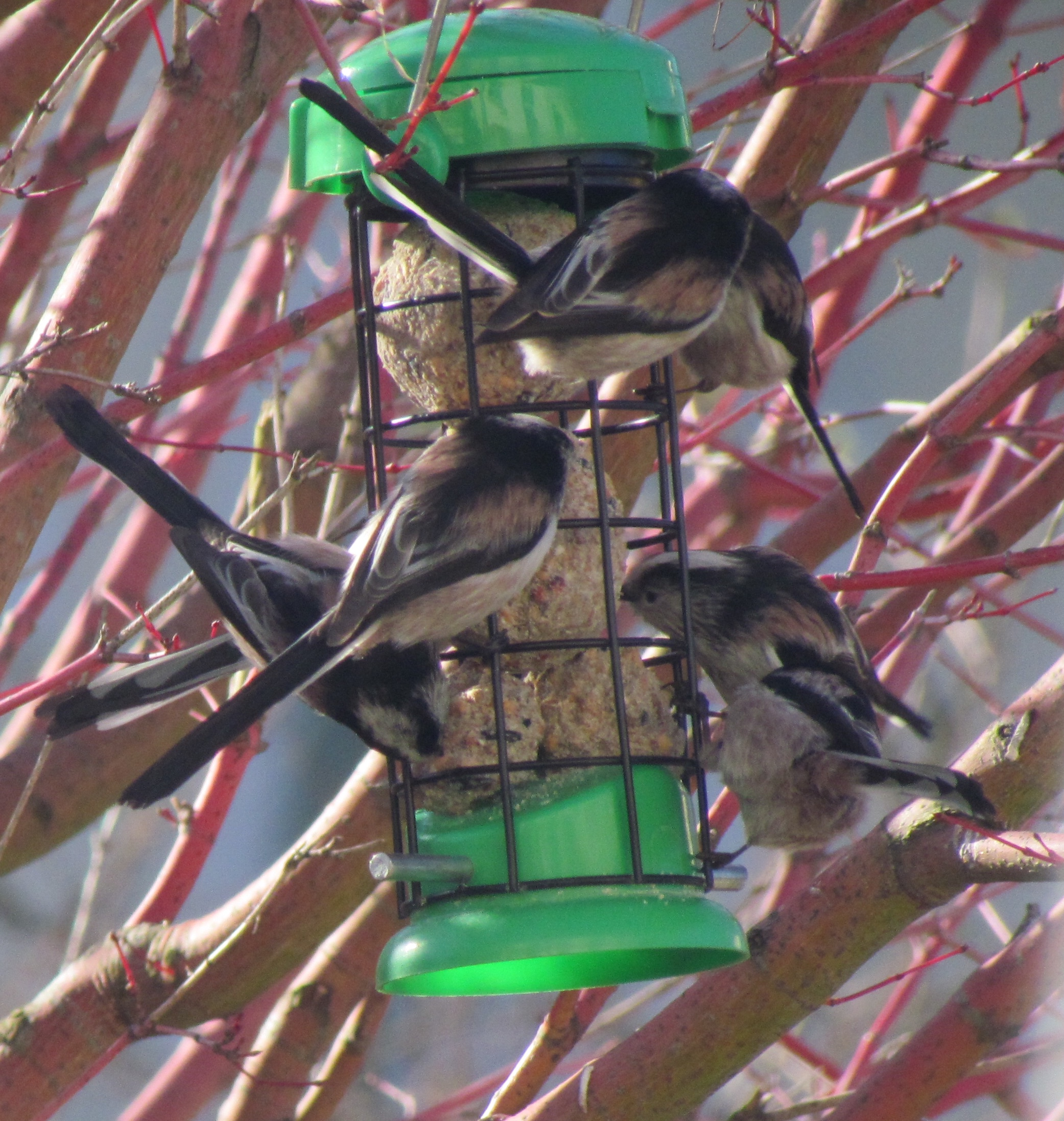
Long-tailed tits on an urban feeder, Plymouth, Devon

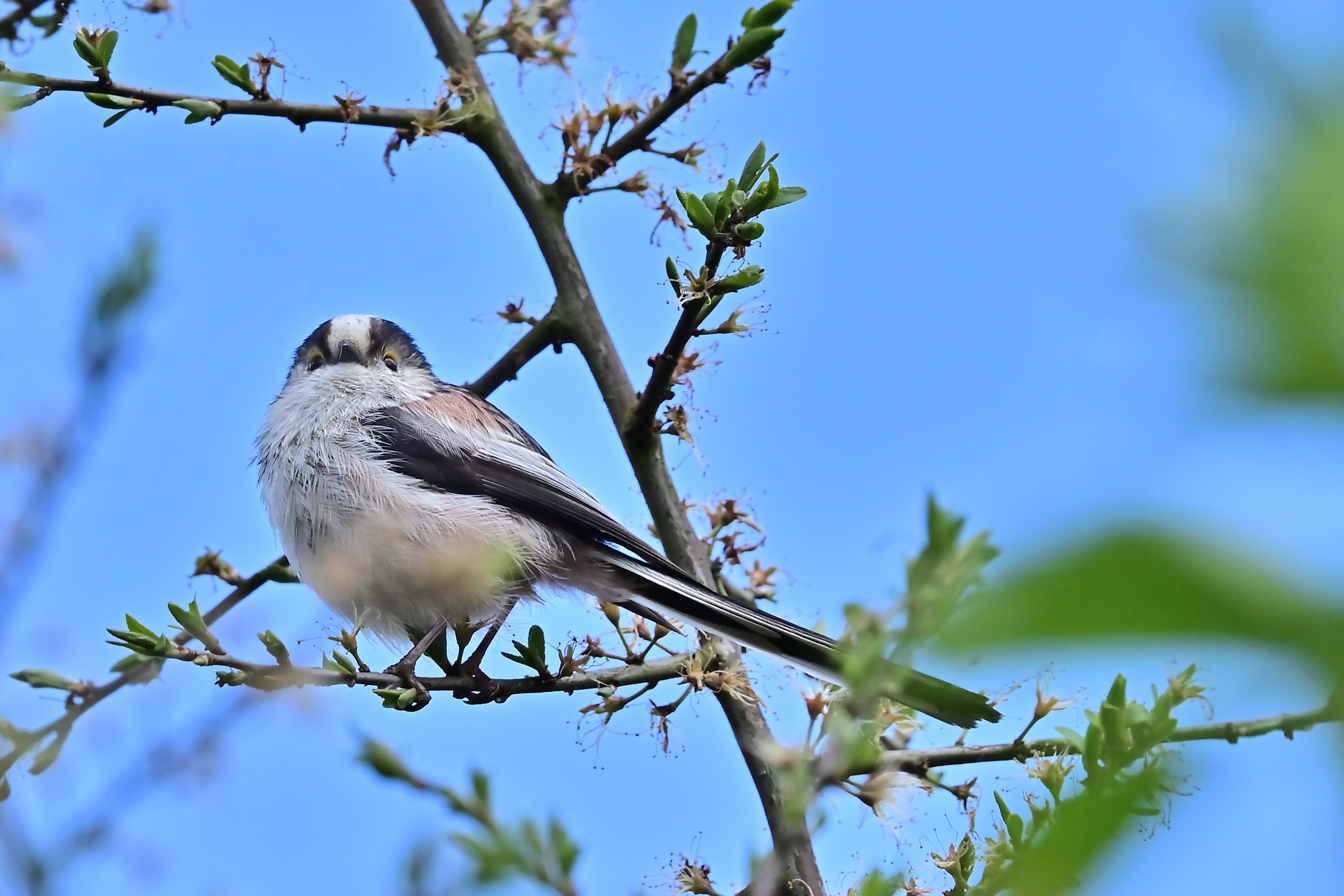
Long-tailed tit in northern Germany

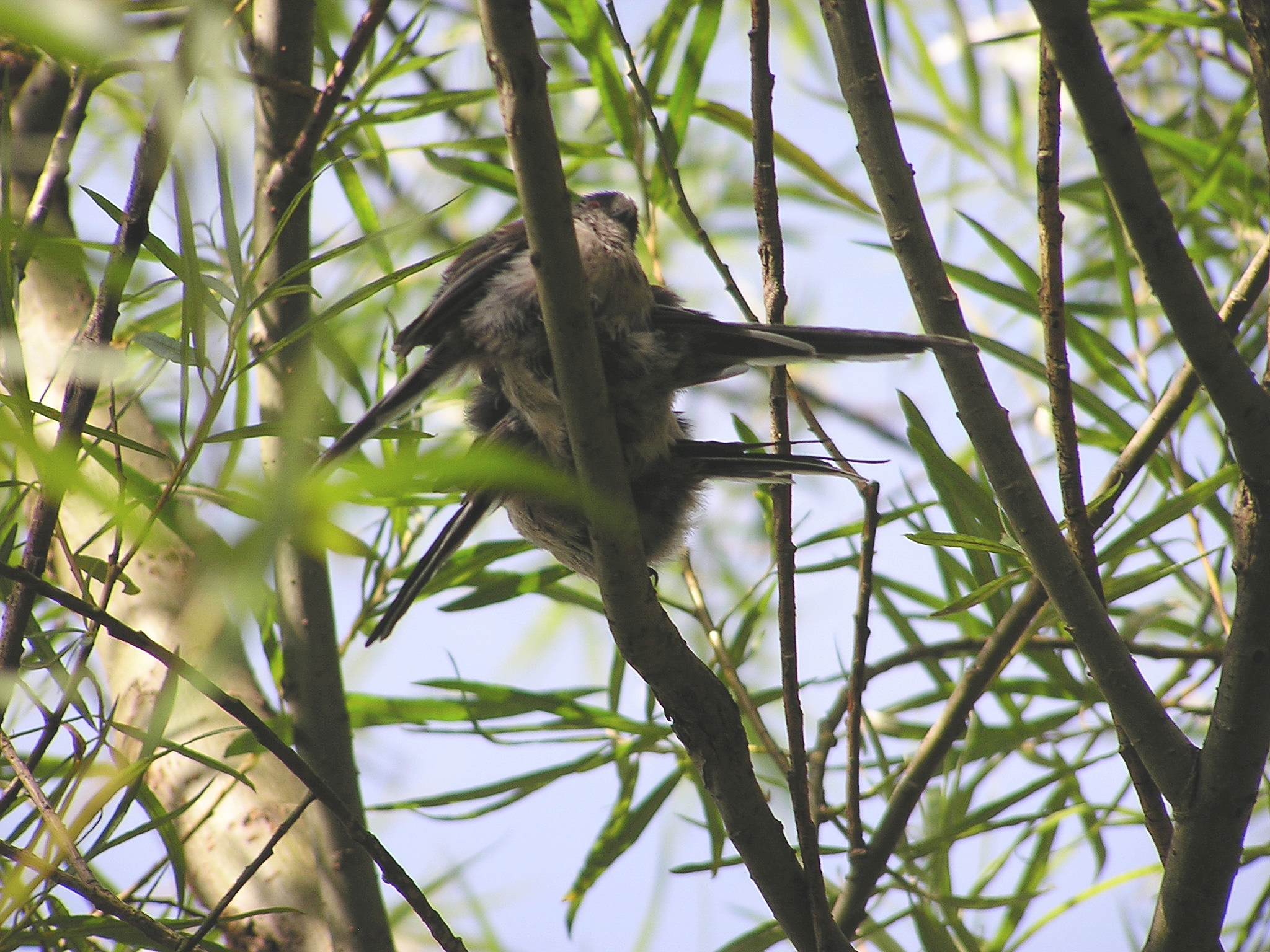
Long-tailed tits resting, mid-afternoon in energy saving anti-parallel paired formation in a willow

== General and cited references ==
- Cramp, Stanley; Perrins, C.M., eds. (1993). "Aegithalos caudatus Long-tailed tit". Handbook of the Birds of Europe the Middle East and North Africa: The Birds of the Western Palearctic. Vol. VII: Flycatchers to Strikes. Oxford University Press. pp. 133–145. ISBN 978-0-19-857510-8. OCLC 637097821.
