= Frederick Bond (naturalist) =

English entomologist (1811–1889)

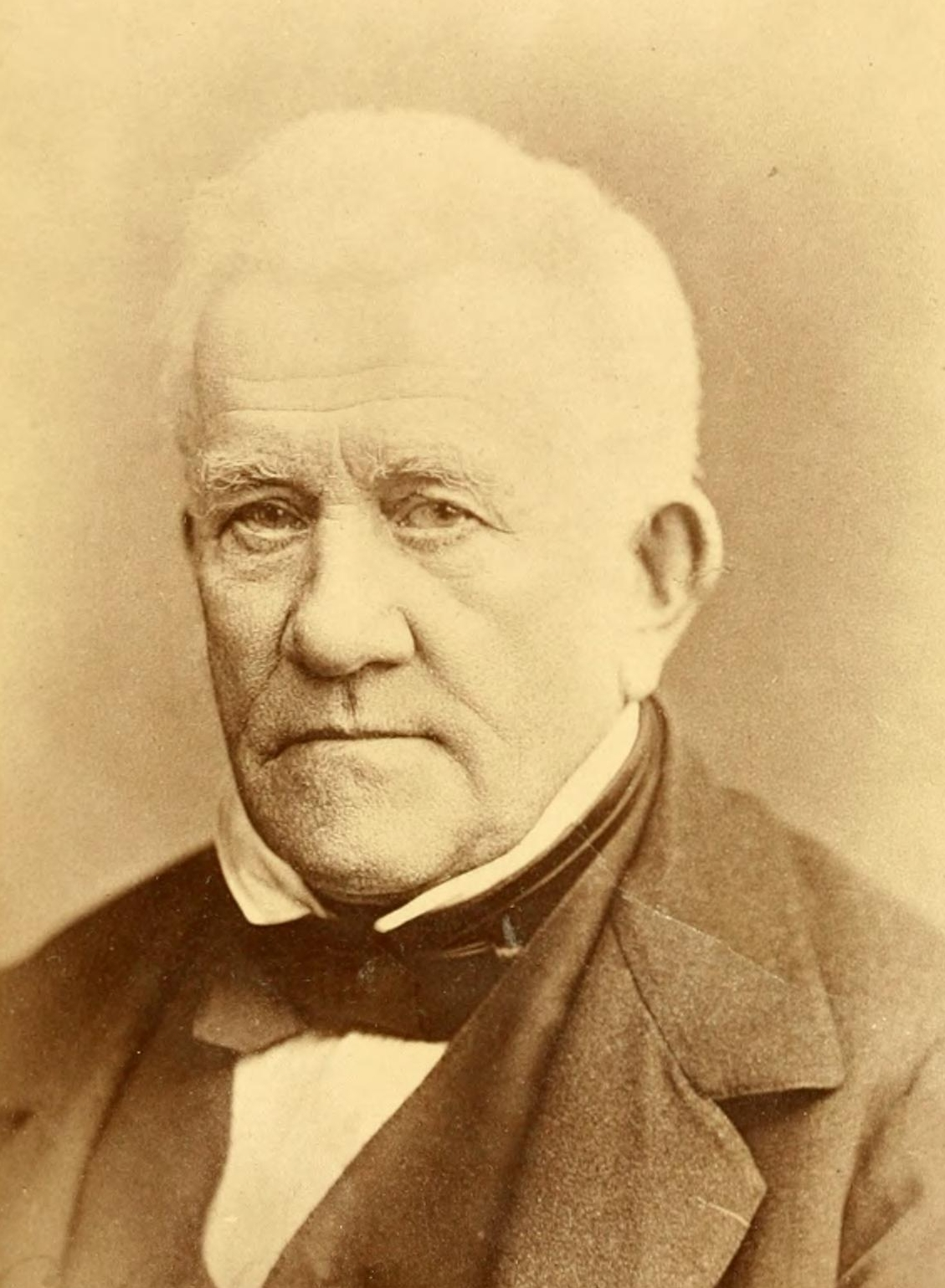
- Born: 22 February 1811
- Died: 10 August 1889; Staines-upon-Thames

Signature
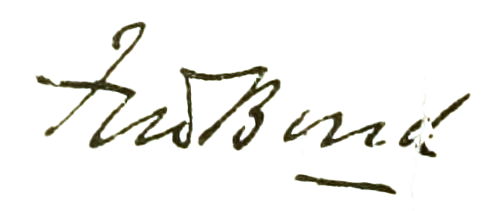

Frederick Bond (22 February 1811 – 10 August 1889) was an English naturalist who was one of the founders of the journal The Zoologist. He was a fellow of the Zoological Society of London, the Linnean Society of London and the Entomological Society.

== Life and work ==
Bond was born in Exmouth, third son of Captain William Bond of the 77th Foot. After the death of his father, his mother married another army officer Captain Benjamin Bond. Bond began to collect insects from the age of 15, concentrating entirely on those found around him. He studied at Brighton and initially sought to study medicine. Unable, however, to bear the sight of dissections, and having enough means to live without having to work, he devoted his life to natural history, living with his widowed half-sister and her family. He collected birds, eggs, plants and insects, particularly the lepidoptera. He reared numerous species of moths and his friend Henry Guard Knaggs named a moth after him as Tapinostola bondi (also known as "Bond's Wainscot") which is now considered a subspecies, Chortodes morrisii bondii, which may be extinct. Francis Pascoe named a longhorn beetle from India from Bond's collection as Sthenias bondii (now Xynenon bondi) after him. He lived in Kingsbury until 1855 and then at Haverstock Hill followed by later life at Staines. He joined the Zoological Society of London in 1854 and was elected to the Entomological Society in 1841. Along with many others, he helped Edward Newman found The Zoologist in 1843. He published short notes on birds, insects, frogs and other matters in the journal starting from the very first issue, right until his death. In his later life he stopped attending the meetings at which he was a regular on account of his deafness. He did not publish extensively but was known for his knowledge and extensive lore which he was happy to share with anyone interested. Close entomological associates included Octavius Pickard-Cambridge. He used to say that a naturalist needed three lives – seventy years for collecting, seventy to study the collection, and seventy to share knowledge.
