= Xynenon =

Scientific classification
- Kingdom: Animalia
- Phylum: Arthropoda
- Class: Insecta
- Order: Coleoptera
- Suborder: Polyphaga
- Infraorder: Cucujiformia
- Family: Cerambycidae
- Genus: Xynenon
- Species: X. bondi

Binomial name
- Xynenon bondi (Pascoe, 1859)

Genus of beetles

Xynenon bondi is a species of beetle in the family Cerambycidae, and the only species in the genus Xynenon. It was described by Francis Polkinghorne Pascoe in 1859 and named after the entomologist Frederick Bond.
