= Oliver Vernon Aplin =

British ornithologist (1858–1940)

Oliver Vernon Aplin MBOU
- Born: 5 December 1858; Bodicote, Oxfordshire, England
- Died: 8 November 1940 (aged 81); Banbury, Oxfordshire, England
- Occupation: Ornithologist
- Notable work: Birds of Oxfordshire

Oliver Vernon Aplin (5 December 1858 – 8 November 1940) was a British ornithologist.

Aplin was born in Bodicote, Oxfordshire, the son of solicitor Benjamin W. Aplin and Barbara Aplin. He was educated in Leamington Spa, Warwickshire, but lived the rest of his life in Oxfordshire, with a keen interest in the natural history of the area. He published a number of papers and notes on British birds, particularly those of Oxfordshire, Norfolk and the Lleyn Peninsula, North Wales. In 1892, he published a list of the birds in Banbury with his two brothers, Frederick C. Aplin and Rev. Benjamin D'Oyley Aplin.

He regularly contributed annual reports on the ornithology of Oxfordshire to The Zoologist from 1894 until the journal ceased publication in 1916. He is probably best known as the author of the Birds of Oxfordshire, published in 1889. He was elected a member of the British Ornithologists' Union in 1888. He made a number of trips abroad during the 1890s, visiting Switzerland with William Warde Fowler in 1891 and collecting in Uruguay (1892), Eastern Algeria (1895) and north Norway (1896).

== Bibliography ==
- Aplin, Oliver Vernon (1889). Birds of Oxfordshire. Oxford: Clarendon Press. OCLC 4413840 (all editions).
- —— (1899). "Notes on the Birds of Belgium". The Zoologist. 4. 3 (694, April): 149–163.
- —— (1900). "The Birds of Lleyn, West Carnarvonshire". The Zoologist. 4. 4 (713, November): 489–505.
