= The Zoologist =

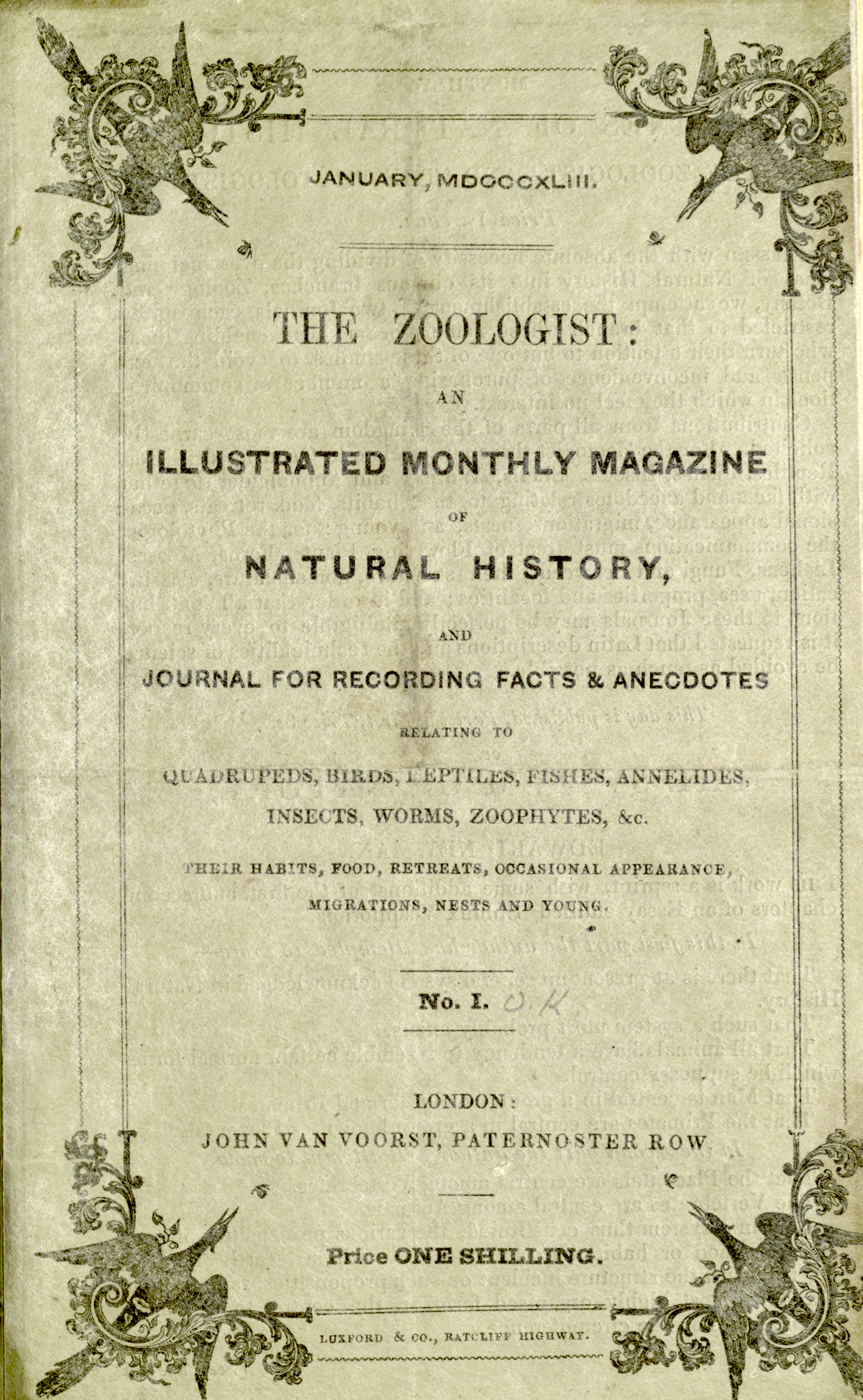
- cover of first issue
- Discipline: Zoology
- Language: en
- Edited by: E. Newman (1843–1876), J.E. Harting (1876–1896), W.L. Distant (1897–1916)

Publication details
- History: 1843–1916
- Publisher: John Van Voorst (1843–1886), Simpkin, Marshall & Co. (1886–1915), West, Newman & Co. (1897–1916) (United Kingdom)
- Frequency: monthly

Standard abbreviations
- ISO 4: Zoologist

The Zoologist was a monthly natural history magazine established in 1843 by Edward Newman and published in London. Newman acted as editor-in-chief until his death in 1876, when he was succeeded, first by James Edmund Harting (1876–1896), and later by William Lucas Distant (1897–1916).

Originating from an enlargement of The Entomologist, The Zoologist described itself as "an illustrated monthly magazine of natural history", but also as a "journal for recording facts & anecdotes relating to quadrupeds, birds, reptiles, fishes, annelides, insects, worms, zoophytes, &c." and it aimed at describing "their habits, food, retreats, occasional appearance, migrations, nests and young." It contained long articles, short notes, comments on current events, and book reviews covering the entire Animal Kingdom throughout the world, until The Entomologist was separated again in 1864. Initially, half of the space was devoted to birds, rising to two-thirds later.

In 1916 The Zoologist was amalgamated with British Birds.

== Founders ==
The Zoologist was one of the projects of the "entrepreneurial scientific printer and publisher" Edward Newman. He was an entomologist with a wide network of contacts with other naturalists, and one of the founders of the Entomological Society of London in 1833. Apart from being a printer and publisher, he also published himself on a wide range of subjects.

The idea behind The Zoologist was, rather than (only) publishing articles by experts, to rely on its readers to furnish it with material. Apart from the commercial aspect, this was also a demonstration of an early belief in the power of citizen science by its founder. Newman was strongly inspired by the 18th century parson-naturalist Gilbert White, who wrote The Natural History and Antiquities of Selborne, published in 1789, and reprinted hundreds of times since.

Newman can be characterised as a typical representative of the English popular science periodical editor of the nineteenth century. He had already contributed to the Magazine of Natural History; he edited and printed the Entomological Magazine from 1832 to 1836, and then the Entomologist from 1840 to 1842.

In 1889, James Edmund Harting, who was then the editor of The Zoologist, wrote an extensive memorial (of nearly twenty-two pages) for Frederick Bond. In this text he reminded that Bond was "one of those who—with the brothers Doubleday, Thomas Bell, William Borrer, Bree, Couch, W.B. Fisher, J.H. Gurney, Hewitson, Waring Kidd, A.E. Knox, Bodd, Salmon, Frederick Smith, William Thompson, and Yarrell (...)—helped the late Edward Newman to found" The Zoologist.

== Editors ==
The first editor of The Zoologist was Edward Newman. He died in 1876. Volume 11 of the second series, the thirty-fourth volume of the journal, was the last volume with which he was connected.

The third series, starting in 1877 and ending in 1896, was edited by James Edmund Harting.

William Lucas Distant was the editor of the fourth series, from 1878 to 1914 (vol. 18).

The last two volumes of the fourth series, and of the journal, were edited by Frank Finn.

== Four series ==
The Zoologist appeared in four series:

- First series: 1843–1865 (vols. 1–23)
- Second series: 1866–1876 (vols. 1–10)
- Third series: 1877–1896 (vols. 1–20)
- Fourth series: 1897–1916 (vols. 1–20)

=== First series, 1843–1865 ===
The first series of The Zoologist was edited by Edward Newman and published by John Van Voorst in London. From the beginning Newman received contributions from many naturalists. In the first year for instance John Christopher Atkinson, Henry Doubleday, John Henry Gurney Sr., Frederick Bond, and William Yarrell wrote articles. Newman also contributed articles himself.

In general, the first volumes were published in monthly issues of 32 pages, and also as an annual. The pages were numbered continuously, so for instance the first issue of the fourth volume (January 1846) was numbered pp. 1201–1232 and the twelfth issue of the twenty-third volume (December 1865) was numbered 9825–9848.

=== Second series, 1866–1876 ===
The second series, containing eleven volumes, was also edited by Newman. Starting in January 1866, the page numbering started anew on page 1 and ended with page 5180 in December 1876.

=== Third series, 1877–1896 ===
Editor: James Edmund Harting.

=== Fourth series, 1897–1916 ===
Editor of the fourth series was William Lucas Distant, until 1914. Distant mentioned in his 'Valedictory Address' "the substitution of the camera for the gun, more especially among ornithologists." The last two volumes of the journal were edited by Frank Finn. Starting in January 1917 The Zoologist was incorporated in British Birds (founded 1908).

Starting with the first issue of the new series the summaries of the proceedings of the scientific societies were no longer a part of the journal.

In 1899 Edmund Selous wrote his first articles, in The Zoologist, about his observations near a nest of Nightjars (Caprimulgus europaeus). A year later he published his study on "the Great Plover", the Eurasian stone-curlew, Burhinus oedicnemus.

In 1899 Henry Eliot Howard published his first articles in the magazine, about birds in North Worcestershire and in the North-West of Ireland.

In 1900 the naturalist Arthur Henry Patterson published the first part of his study on the birds of Great Yarmouth and surroundings.

== Articles ==
Among the numerous articles that appeared in The Zoologist over the years were:

- Davenport, Henry Saunderson (1899). Original sketches of British birds . The Zoologist, 4th series, vol. 3, issue 691 (January), pp. 1–17, issue 695 (May), pp. 198–212 and issue 701 (November 1899), pp. 506–510 – via Wikisource.
- Salter, John Henry (1899). Ornithological Notes from Northern Norway . The Zoologist, 4th series, vol. 3, issue 692 (February), pp. 54–71 – via Wikisource.
- Aplin, Oliver Vernon (1899). Notes on the Birds of Belgium . The Zoologist, 4th series, vol. 3, issue 694 (April), pp. 149–163 – via Wikisource.
- Selous, Edmund (1899). An Observational Diary of the Habits of Nightjars (Caprimulgus europæus), Mostly of a Sitting Pair. Notes Taken at Time and on Spot . The Zoologist, 4th series, vol. 3, issue 699 (September 1899), pp. 388-402 and issue 701 (November 1899), pp. 486-505 – via Wikisource.
- —— (1900). An Observational Diary of the Habits of the Great Plover (Œdicnemus crepitans) during September and October . The Zoologist, 4th series, vol. 4 – via Wikisource. (Published in three parts)
- Howard, Henry Eliot (1899a). Notes on Some Birds from North Worcestershire . The Zoologist, 4th series, vol. 3, issue 696 (June 1899), p.259–261 – via Wikisource.
- —— (1899b). Ornithological Notes from the North-West of Ireland . The Zoologist, 4th series, vol. 3, issue 701 (November 1899), pp. 481–485 – via Wikisource.
- Patterson, Arthur (1900–1901). "The Birds of Great Yarmouth and the Neighbourhood" . The Zoologist. The Zoologist – via Wikisource. (Published in five parts in vols. 4 and 5)
- Warren, Amy (1879). "The land and freshwater Mollusca of Mayo and Sligo". The Zoologist. 3 (3): 25–29.

== See also ==
- Since 2003 The Zoological Society of Nigeria publishes the peer-reviewed journal (The) Zoologist.
- Since 1914 the Royal Zoological Society of New South Wales issues The Australian Zoologist. In 1985 the name changed into Australian Zoologist.
- List of zoology journals.

== Sources ==
- Bourne, dr. W.R.P. (1995-01-01). "In memory of 'the Zoologist' 1843-1916" (PDF). British Birds. 88: 1–4.
- Wale, Matthew (n.d.). "The Zoologist (1843-1916)". Constructing Scientific Communities. Archived from the original on 2022-12-07.
- Wale, Matthew (2022). Making Entomologists: How Periodicals Shaped Scientific Communities in Nineteenth-Century Britain. Pittsburgh PA: University of Pittsburgh Press. ISBN 9780822947516.
