= James Edmund Harting =

English ornithologist and naturalist

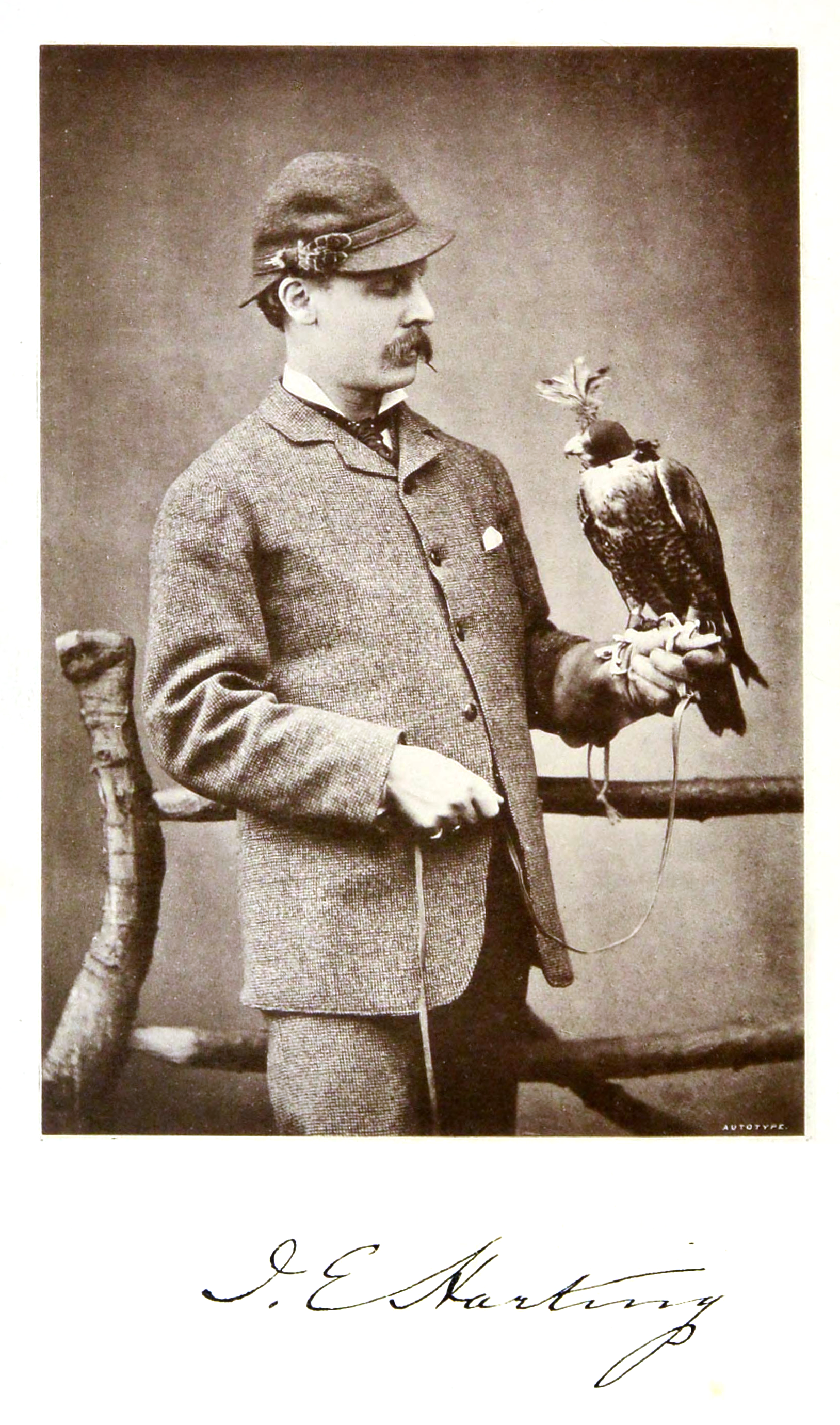
- Born: 29 April 1841; Chelsea, London, United Kingdom of Great Britain & Ireland
- Died: 16 January 1928 (aged 86); Weybridge, Surrey, United Kingdom
- Citizenship: British
- Scientific career
- Fields: Natural history, ornithology

James Edmund Harting (29 April 1841 – 16 January 1928) was an English ornithologist and naturalist who wrote numerous books and articles in journals, as well as serving as an editor of several British natural history periodicals.

== Biography ==
Harting was the eldest son of Roman Catholic solicitor James Vincent Harting and Alexine Milne Fotheringham. He was educated at Downside School (1854–60) and the University of London and spent much of his youth travelling on the Continent, spending time at the museums in Paris and Leiden. Passing all the exams to become a solicitor, except for criminal law, he worked at his profession from 1868 to 1878, before turning to natural history and writing.

He published his first article for The Field on 13 March 1869 and remained on the staff for fifty years, becoming editor of the Naturalist Department in 1871 and later editor of the Shooting Department. By 1920 he had contributed 2,326 articles as well as 124 obituary notices, as well as "Answers to Correspondents" which he wrote on Natural History, Falconry, Angling and other issues.

== Natural history ==
Harting edited The Zoologist from 1877 to 1896 and was considered an authority on British birds. He was Assistant Secretary and Librarian to the Linnean Society. He was a Fellow of the Linnæan Society; a life member of the Zoological Society; member of the British Ornithologists' Union and a corresponding member of the American Ornithologists Union. In 1880 he was awarded a Silver Medal by the Acclimatisation Society of France "for publications".

In 1871 he was invited to join the Prince of Wales (King Edward VII) on a trip to India but declined as it required him to be away from work for too long.

== Falconry ==
Late in the 1870s, Harting founded the New Hawking Club to enable Londoners to observe falconry; the Old Hawking Club was based on Salisbury Plain, which was too far away for most people. He bought peregrine falcons and gyrfalcons from John Barr, who had worked for Sandys Dugmore as a professional falconer from 1874-1877, hired Barr as a falconer and obtained permission from Lord Rosebery to use Epsom Downs for hawking. He set up near the Grandstand of the racecourse and had a successful season in the autumn of 1878, but the birds died of the croaks in the winter, ending the venture.

Harting compiled Bibliotheca Accipitraria over many years, and was one of the few men seen in London with a hawk on his fist.

== Death and legacy ==
Harting died aged 86 on 16 January 1928 in Weybridge, Surrey, where he lived for most of his life, and is buried in the Town Cemetery. His headstone reads:

Pray for the Soul of Elizabeth Maria wife of James Edmund Harting of Weybridge, in the Co.[unty] of Surrey, who departed this life 25th Jan 1907. Also of James Edmund Harting Died 16th, January 1928 Aged 85 Years [sic]. Also Etheldreda Mary Harting Died 23rd, Jan 1942 Aged 71.

He married Elizabeth Lynch, daughter of J. M. Lynch of Co. Kildare, Ireland, in 1868. There was a son, Hugh, and a daughter, Etheldreda, to the marriage. The Field's obituary states that:

J.E. Harting was modest and unassuming but he knew the value of knowledge, and never hesitated to use the authority of his long experience... He made very little money, for he worked for what he loved, because he loved it first as a sportsman and a gentleman, and he expected fair treatment, which he invariably extended to others.

Part of Harting’s library was sold in 1893; more was dispersed at his death, and the remainder was given to Downside Abbey in 1934.

== Books ==
His books included:

- The Birds of Middlesex (1866)
- The ornithology of Shakespeare. Critically examined, explained, and illustrated (1871)
- Hints on Shore Shooting (1871)
- A handbook of British birds (1872)
- The fauna of the Prybilov Islands (1875)
- Our summer migrants. An account of the migratory birds which pass the summer in the British islands (1875)
- Rambles in Search of Shells (1876)
- Ostriches and Ostrich Farming (1877) with Julius de Mosenthal
- British Animals extinct within Historic Times (1880)
- Essays on sport and natural history (1883)
- Sketches of bird life (1883)
- Bibliotheca accipitraria; a catalogue of books ancient and modern relating to falconry, with notes, glossary and vocabulary (1891)
- Recreations of a naturalist (1906)
