= Henry Eliot Howard =

Henry Eliot Howard JP
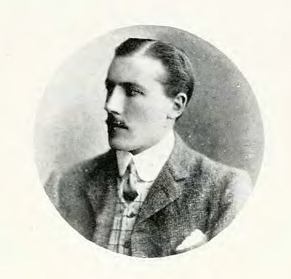
- Born: 13 November 1873; Kidderminster, Worcestershire, England
- Died: 26 December 1940 (aged 67); Stourport-on-Severn, Worcestershire, England
- Education: Eton; Mason College, now the University of Birmingham
- Occupation: Factory director
- Known for: Ornithology
- Notable work: See Bibliography

Henry Eliot Howard JP (13 November 1873 – 26 December 1940) was an English amateur ornithologist, noted for being one of the first to describe territoriality behaviours in birds in a detailed manner. His ideas on territoriality were influential in the work of Max Nicholson.

== Biography ==
Henry Eliot Howard was born at Stone House, (Note: Now known as "The Stonehouse", the early 18th-century building, still extant, was Grade II listed in 1958; coordinates: 52.37368°N 2.203982°W) at Stone, near Kidderminster, second son of Henry Howard and Alice Gertrude Thomson. He studied at Stoke Poges, Eton, and Mason College (the forerunner of the University of Birmingham). He entered his father's steelworks firm, Lloyd and Lloyd in Worcester, becoming a director in 1896. Then in 1903 a director of the enlarged firm, Stewarts & Lloyds.

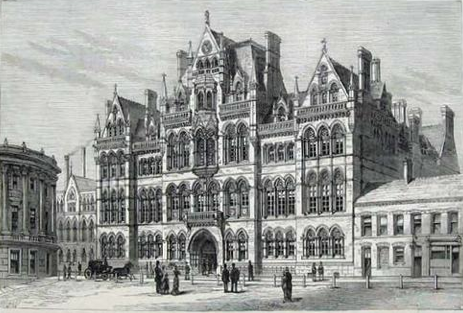
Mason College, now the University of Birmingham

He showed from his earliest childhood an intense love of natural history. It was not until 1914 that his first work, British Warblers, illustrated by Henrik Grönvold, was fully published, having been issued in parts since 1907. Continually working on the theory of territory, he published Territory in Bird Life, illustrated by George Edward Lodge and Henrik Grönvold, in 1920 (a reissue in 1948 had an introduction by Julian Huxley and James Fisher), followed by An Introduction to the Study of Bird Behaviour, Nature of a Bird's World and lastly A Waterhen's Worlds, in 1940. His books were published under the name "Eliot Howard".

He was a Justice of the Peace and for forty-five years a member of the British Ornithologists' Union, including a period as a vice-president.

His home was always in Worcestershire. In 1900 he still gave his address as Stone House, but once married he and his wife lived at 'Clareland', Hartlebury, which overlooked the River Severn, and in whose grounds he conducted much of his ornithological research (Note: Clareland is extant, and was Grade II listed in 1969.; coordinates: 52.323735°N 2.256792°W) Nonetheless, much of his time was spent on the wild coast of Donegal and in the north west of Ireland, shooting, fishing and studying natural history. He was attracted to the wild and beautiful area of Horn Head in the North West of Donegal, close to the Atlantic Ocean, through his marriage in 1900 to Anne Elizabeth Frances Stewart (1875–1960) whose family had lived there for many years (the 1901 census of Ireland shows his wife was born in Donegal). He died of meningitis at Clareland on 26 December 1940 and was buried at St Mary's Church, Bishops Green, Stourport, on 30 December. An obituary was published in The Times on 28 December.

His papers are in the Alexander Library, at the University of Oxford.

His father, Henry was a manufacturing chemist and was son of John Eliot Howard. John's father was Luke Howard. The 1901 Census shows Henry Eliot as an 'Iron tube manufacturer'.

The Howards had two sons and four daughters. One daughter, Esme Eleanor Howard, married the Reverend John William Fletcher Boughey, son of the Reverend Percy Fletcher Boughey and Elsie de Strange Herring, on 25 April 1940.

== Bibliography ==
=== Books ===
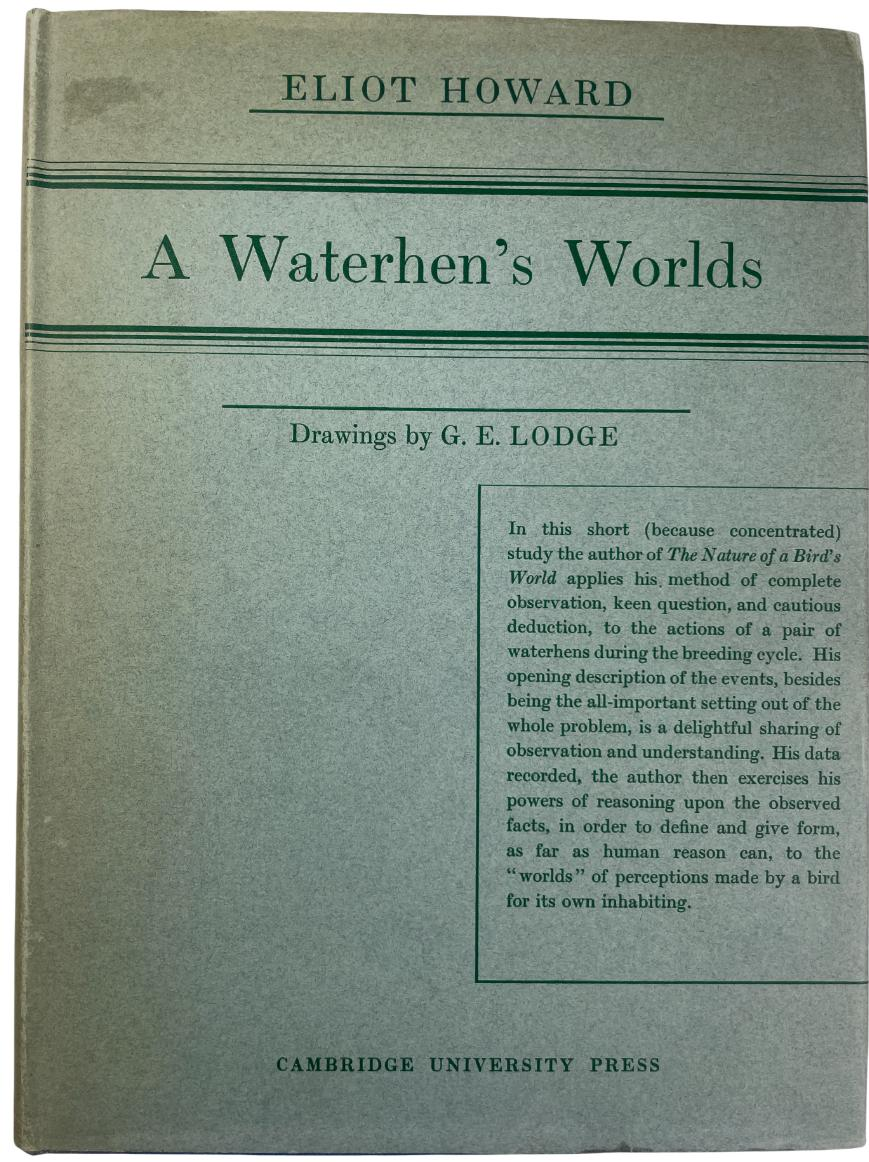
A Waterhen's Worlds

- Howard, Eliot (1907–14). The British Warblers: A History with Problems of Their Lives. R. H. Porter. 2 vols.
- —— (1920). Territory in Bird Life. John Murray.
- —— (1929). An Introduction to the Study of Bird Behaviour. Cambridge University Press.
- —— (1935). The Nature of a Bird's World. Cambridge University Press.
- —— (1940). A Waterhen's Worlds. Cambridge University Press.

=== Journal articles ===
- Howard, Henry Eliot (1899a). "Notes on Some Birds from North Worcestershire" . The Zoologist. 4th series, vol. 3, issue 696 (June, 1899), p. 259–261 – via Wikisource.
- —— (1899b). "Ornithological Notes from the North-West of Ireland" . The Zoologist. 4th series, vol. 3, issue 701 (November, 1899), p. 481–485 – via Wikisource.
- —— (1900a). "Unusual Numbers of Green Plover in Worcestershire". The Zoologist. 4th series, vol. 4 (706 (April, 1900), section 'Notes and Queries'): 187. (Note: Green plover: (Northern) lapwing (Vanellus vanellus))
- —— (1900b). "Variations in the Notes and Songs of Birds in different Districts". The Zoologist. 4th series, vol. 4 (710 (August, 1900), section 'Notes and Queries'): 382–383.
- —— (1901a). "The Grasshopper-Warbler (Locustella nævia) in North Worcestershire." . The Zoologist. 4th series, vol. 5, issue 716 (February, 1901), p. 60–63 – via Wikisource.
- —— (1901b). "On the increase of the Starling and the Hawfinch". The Zoologist. 4th series, vol. 5 (726 (December, 1901)): 463-467.
- 1902a: 'On Mr. Selous' Theory of the Origin of Nests'. The Zoologist, 4th series, vol. 6, p. 145–148.
- 1902b: 'Cirl Bunting in Ireland'. The Zoologist, 4th series, vol. 6, (section 'Notes and Queries'), p. 353/4
- 1902c: 'The Birds of Sark; and Variation in Song'. The Zoologist, 4th series, vol. 6, p. 416–422.
- —— (1903). "On Sexual Selection and the Aesthetic Sense in Birds". The Zoologist. 4 (7): 407–417.

== Sources ==
- Burkhardt, Richard W. Jr. (n.d.). "Howard, Henry Eliot". Complete Dictionary of Scientific Biography. encyclopedia.com.
- Lowe, Percy R. (1941). "Henry Eliot Howard. An Appreciation". British Birds. 34: 195–197. Archived from the original on 8 August 2020. (Also available via BHL.)
