= List of birds of Bangladesh =

This is a list of the bird species recorded in Bangladesh. The avifauna of Bangladesh include a total of 827 species, of which two have been introduced by humans. Fifty-one species are globally threatened.

This list's taxonomic treatment (designation and sequence of orders, families and species) and nomenclature (common and scientific names) follow the conventions of The Clements Checklist of Birds of the World, 2022 edition. The family accounts at the beginning of each heading reflect this taxonomy, as do the species counts found in each family account. Introduced and accidental species are included in the total counts for Bangladesh.

The following tags have been used to highlight several categories. The commonly occurring native species do not fall into any of these categories.

- (A) Accidental - a species that rarely or accidentally occurs in Bangladesh
- (I) Introduced - a species introduced to Bangladesh as a consequence, direct or indirect, of human actions
- (Ex) Extirpated - a species that no longer occurs in Bangladesh although populations exist elsewhere

== Ducks, geese, and waterfowl ==
Order: Anseriformes Family: Anatidae

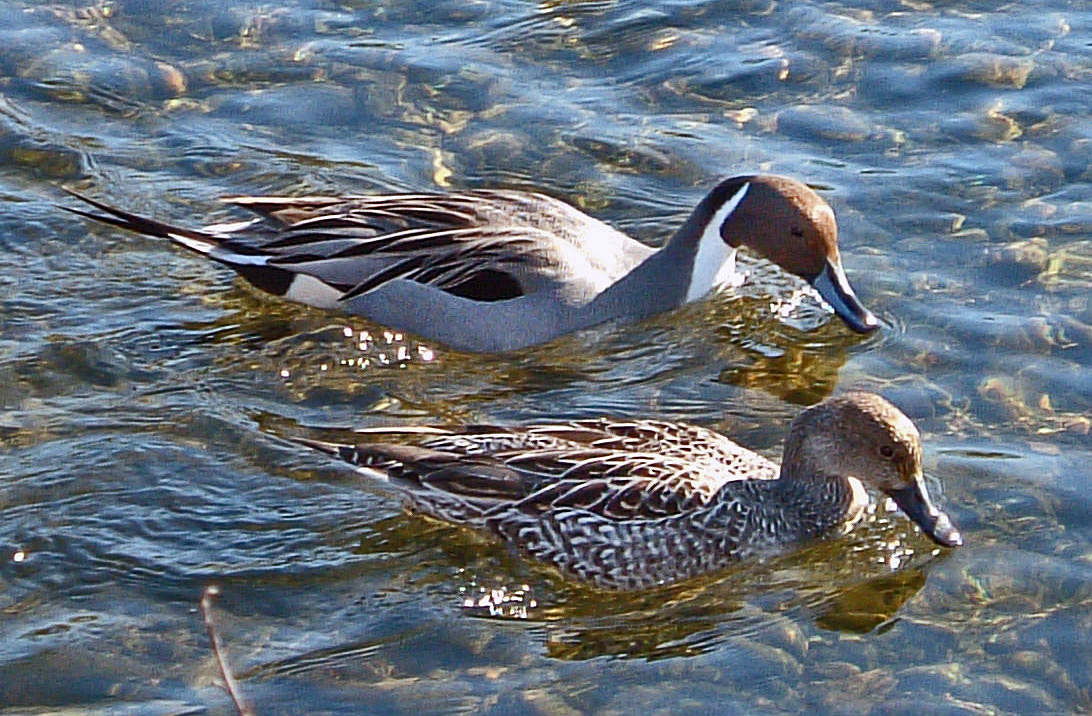
Northern pintail, Anas acuta

Anatidae includes the ducks and most duck-like waterfowl, such as geese and swans. These birds are adapted to an aquatic existence with webbed feet, flattened bills, and feathers that are excellent at shedding water due to an oily coating.

- Fulvous whistling-duck, Dendrocygna bicolor
- Lesser whistling-duck, Dendrocygna javanica
- Bar-headed goose, Anser indicus
- Graylag goose, Anser anser
- Greater white-fronted goose, Anser albifrons
- Lesser white-fronted goose, Anser erythropus (A)
- Taiga bean-goose, Anser fabalis
- Knob-billed duck, Sarkidiornis melanotos
- Ruddy shelduck, Tadorna ferruginea
- Common shelduck, Tadorna tadorna
- Cotton pygmy-goose, Nettapus coromandelianus
- Mandarin duck, Aix galericulata (A)
- Baikal teal, Sibirionetta formosa (A)
- Garganey, Spatula querquedula
- Northern shoveler, Spatula clypeata
- Gadwall, Mareca strepera
- Falcated duck, Mareca falcata (A)
- Eurasian wigeon, Mareca penelope
- Indian spot-billed duck, Anas poecilorhyncha
- Mallard, Anas platyrhynchos
- Northern pintail, Anas acuta
- Green-winged teal, Anas crecca
- Marbled teal, Marmaronetta angustirostris (A)
- Pink-headed duck, Rhodonessa caryophyllacea (A) (Note: Considered accidental by the source, but IUCN considers it a native.)
- White-winged duck, Asarcornis scutulata
- Red-crested pochard, Netta rufina
- Common pochard, Aythya ferina
- Ferruginous duck, Aythya nyroca
- Baer's pochard, Aythya baeri (A)
- Tufted duck, Aythya fuligula
- Greater scaup, Aythya marila
- Common goldeneye, Bucephala clangula
- Smew, Bucephala clangula (A)
- Common merganser, Mergus merganser
- Red-breasted merganser, Mergus serrator (A)

== Pheasants, grouse, and allies ==
Order: Galliformes Family: Phasianidae

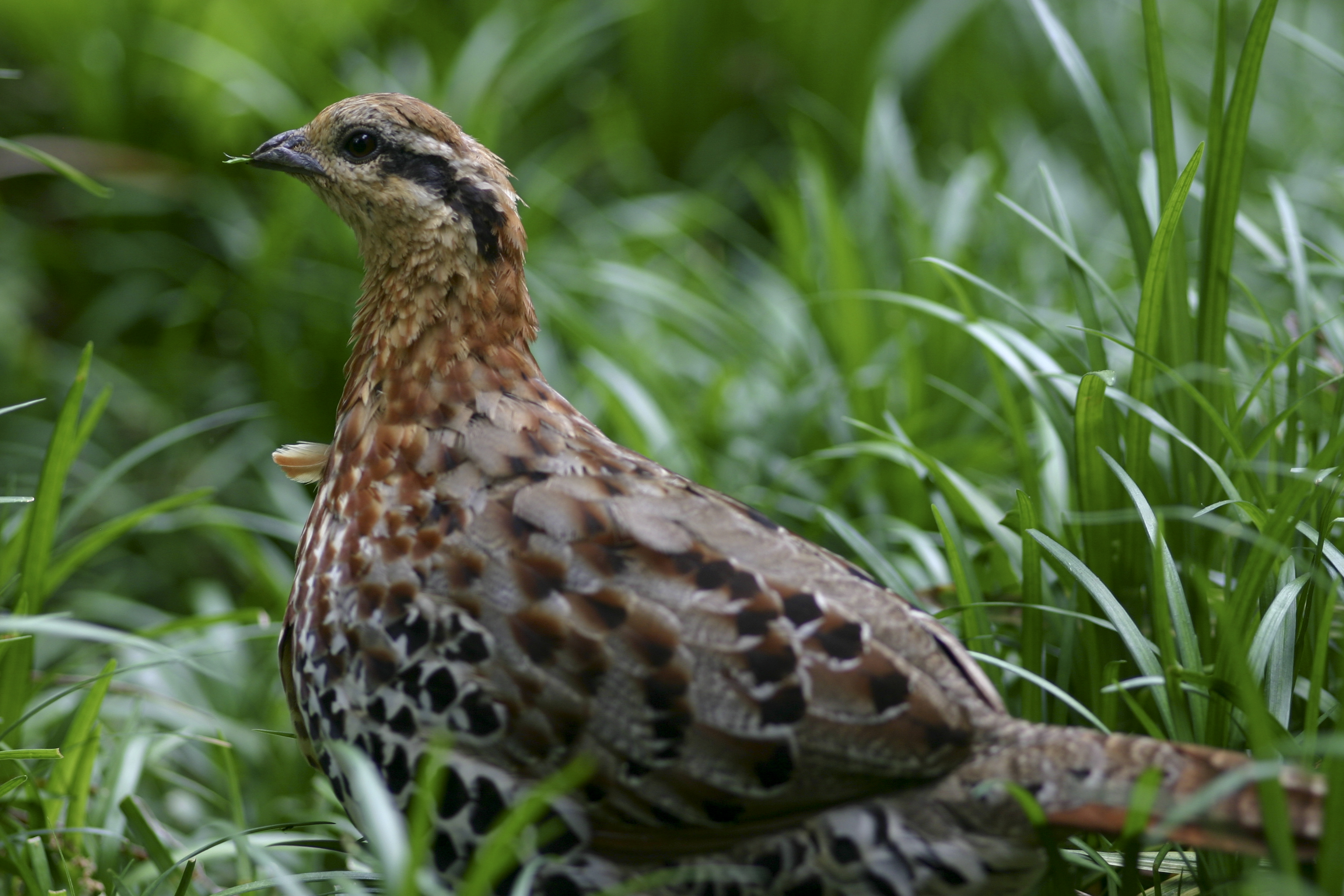
Mountain bamboo partridge, Bambusicola fytchii

The Phasianidae are a family of terrestrial birds. In general, they are plump (although they vary in size) and have broad, relatively short wings.

- Rufous-throated partridge, Arborophila rufogularis
- White-cheeked partridge, Arborophila atrogularis
- Indian peafowl, Pavo cristatus (Ex)
- Green peafowl, Pavo muticus (A)
- Gray peacock-pheasant, Polyplectron bicalcaratum
- Blue-breasted quail, Coturnix chinensis
- Common quail, Coturnix coturnix
- Rain quail, Coturnix coromandelica
- Manipur bush-quail, Perdicula manipurensis
- Black francolin, Francolinus francolinus (A) (Ex)
- Gray francolin, Ortygornis pondicerianus
- Swamp francolin, Ortygornis gularis
- Mountain bamboo-partridge, Bambusicola fytchii
- Red junglefowl, Gallus gallus
- Kalij pheasant, Lophura leucomelanos

== Flamingos ==
Order: Phoenicopteriformes Family: Phoenicopteridae

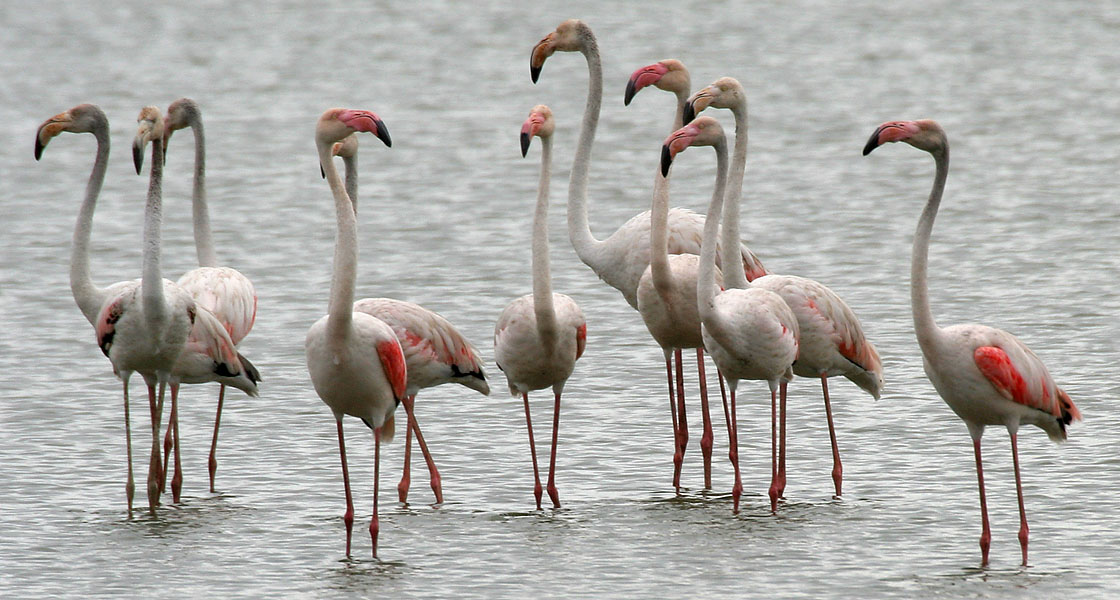
Greater flamingo, Phoenicopterus roseus

Flamingos are gregarious wading birds, usually 3 to 5 feet (0.9 to 1.5 m) tall, found in both the Western and Eastern Hemispheres. Flamingos filter-feed on shellfish and algae. Their oddly shaped beaks are specially adapted to separate mud and silt from the food they consume and, uniquely, are used upside-down.

- Greater flamingo, Phoenicopterus roseus

== Grebes ==
Order: Podicipediformes Family: Podicipedidae

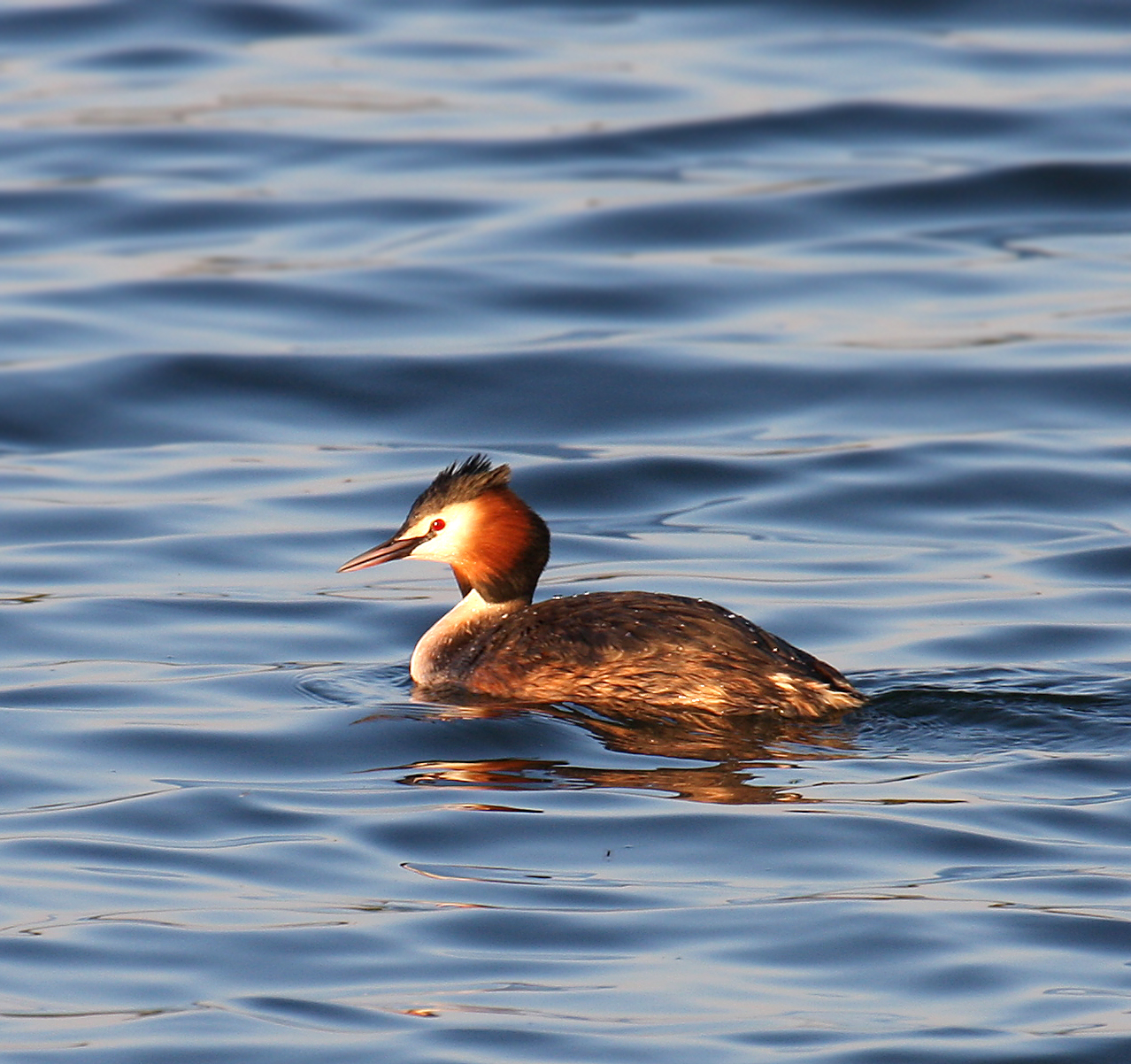
Great crested grebe, Podiceps cristatus (Bangla: chokha)

Grebes are small to medium-large freshwater diving birds. They have lobed toes and are excellent swimmers and divers. However, they have their feet placed far back on the body, making them quite ungainly on land.

- Little grebe, Tachybaptus ruficollis
- Red-necked grebe, Podiceps grisegena (A)
- Great crested grebe, Podiceps cristatus
- Eared grebe, Podiceps nigricollis (A)

== Pigeons and doves ==
Order: Columbiformes Family: Columbidae

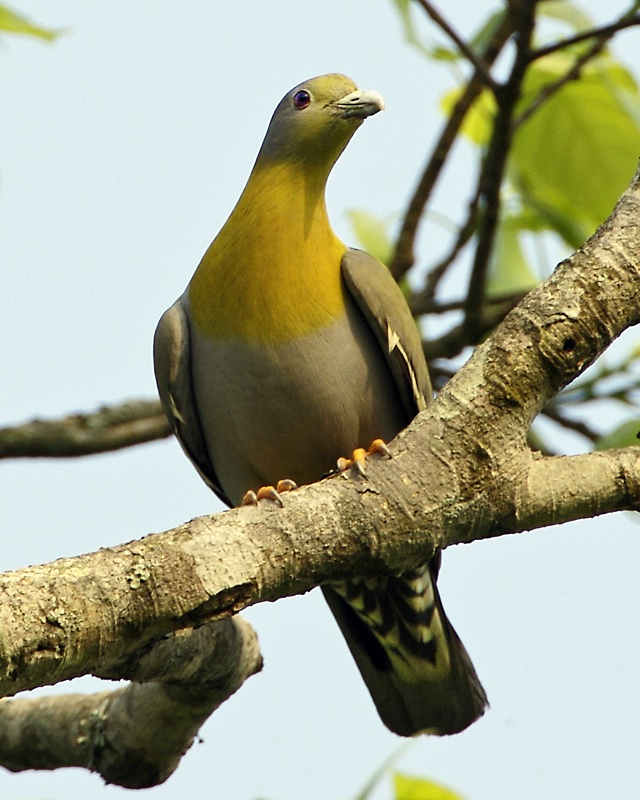
Yellow-footed green pigeon, Treron phoenicoptera

Pigeons and doves are stout-bodied birds with short necks and short slender bills with a fleshy cere.

- Rock pigeon, Columba livia
- Pale-capped pigeon, Columba punicea
- Oriental turtle-dove, Streptopelia orientalis
- Eurasian collared-dove, Streptopelia decaocto
- Red collared-dove, Streptopelia tranquebarica
- Spotted dove, Streptopelia chinensis
- Laughing dove, Streptopelia senegalensis
- Barred cuckoo-dove, Macropygia unchall (A)
- Asian emerald dove, Chalcophaps indica
- Orange-breasted green-pigeon, Treron bicincta
- Ashy-headed green-pigeon, Treron phayerei
- Thick-billed green-pigeon, Treron curvirostra
- Yellow-footed green-pigeon, Treron phoenicoptera
- Pin-tailed green-pigeon, Treron apicauda
- Wedge-tailed green-pigeon, Treron sphenura
- Green imperial-pigeon, Ducula aenea
- Mountain imperial-pigeon, Ducula badia

== Sandgrouse ==
Order: Pterocliformes Family: Pteroclidae

Sandgrouse have small, pigeon like heads and necks, but sturdy compact bodies. They have long pointed wings and sometimes tails and a fast direct flight. Flocks fly to watering holes at dawn and dusk. Their legs are feathered down to the toes.

- Chestnut-bellied sandgrouse, Pterocles exustus
- Painted sandgrouse, Pterocles indicus

== Bustards ==
Order: Otidiformes Family: Otididae

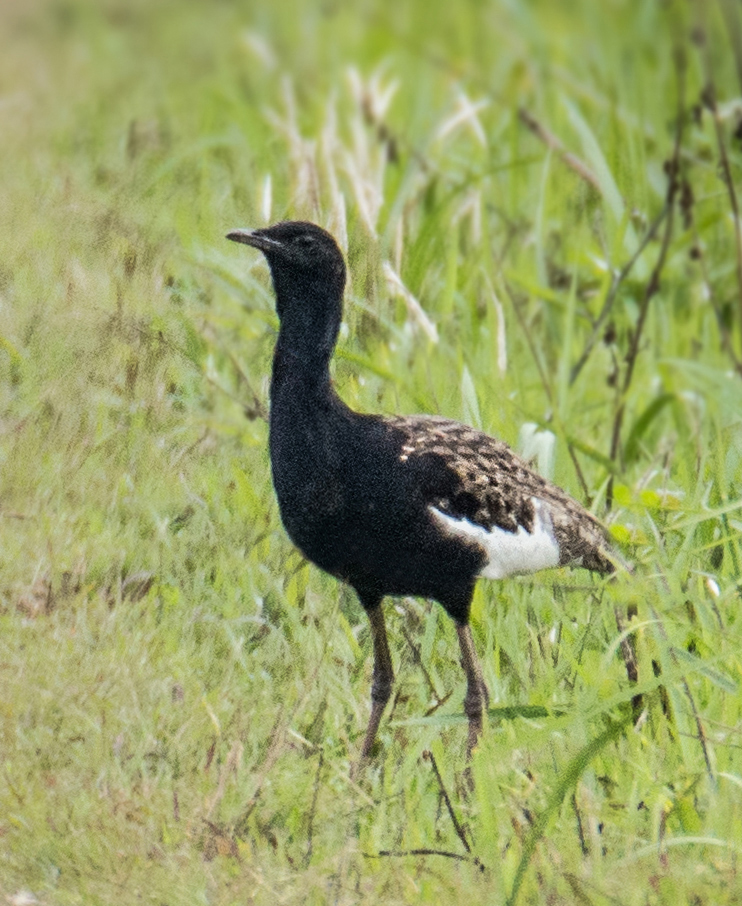
Bengal florican (Houbaropsis bengalensis bengalensis)

Bustards are large terrestrial birds mainly associated with dry open country and steppes in the Old World. They are omnivorous and nest on the ground. They walk steadily on strong legs and big toes, pecking for food as they go. They have long broad wings with "fingered" wingtips and striking patterns in flight. Many have interesting mating displays.

- Bengal florican, Houbaropsis bengalensis (Ex)
- Lesser florican, Sypheotides indicus

== Cuckoos ==
Order: Cuculiformes Family: Cuculidae

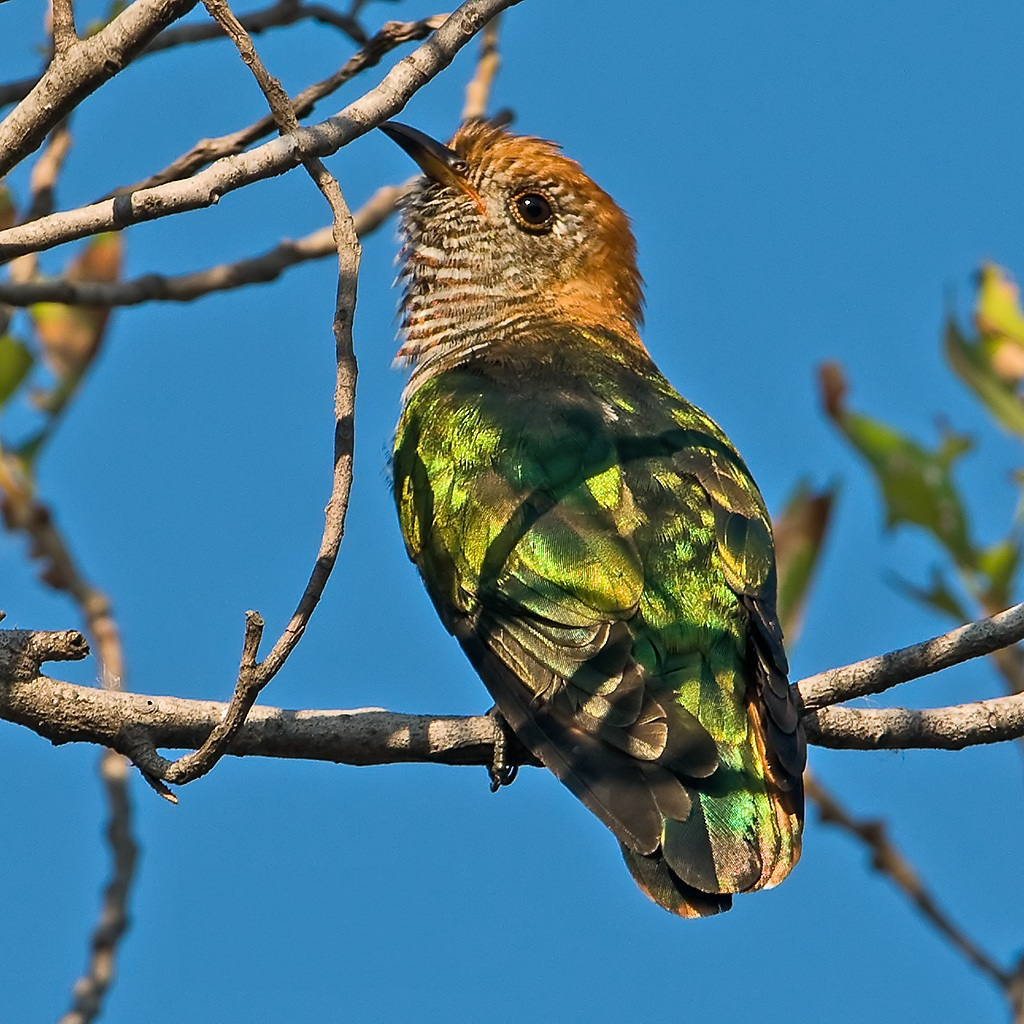
Asian emerald cuckoo, Chrysococcyx maculatus

The family Cuculidae includes cuckoos, roadrunners and anis. These birds are of variable size with slender bodies, long tails and strong legs.

- Greater coucal, Centropus sinensis
- Lesser coucal, Centropus bengalensis
- Sirkeer malkoha, Taccocua leschenaultii
- Green-billed malkoha, Phaenicophaeus tristis
- Chestnut-winged cuckoo, Clamator coromandus
- Pied cuckoo, Clamator jacobinus
- Asian koel, Eudynamys scolopacea
- Asian emerald cuckoo, Chrysococcyx maculatus
- Violet cuckoo, Chrysococcyx xanthorhynchus
- Banded bay cuckoo, Cacomantis sonneratii
- Plaintive cuckoo, Cacomantis merulinus
- Gray-bellied cuckoo, Cacomantis passerinus
- Fork-tailed drongo-cuckoo, Surniculus dicruroides
- Square-tailed drongo-cuckoo, Surniculus lugubris
- Large hawk-cuckoo, Hierococcyx sparverioides
- Common hawk-cuckoo, Hierococcyx varius
- Hodgson's hawk-cuckoo, Hierococcyx nisicolor
- Lesser cuckoo, Cuculus poliocephalus
- Indian cuckoo, Cuculus micropterus
- Himalayan cuckoo, Cuculus saturatus
- Common cuckoo, Cuculus canorus

== Frogmouths ==
Order: Caprimulgiformes Family: Podargidae

The frogmouths are a group of nocturnal birds related to the nightjars. They are named for their large flattened hooked bill and huge frog-like gape, which they use to take insects.

- Hodgson's frogmouth, Batrachostomus hodgsoni

== Nightjars and allies ==
Order: Caprimulgiformes Family: Caprimulgidae

Nightjars are medium-sized nocturnal birds that usually nest on the ground. They have long wings, short legs and very short bills. Most have small feet, of little use for walking, and long pointed wings. Their soft plumage is camouflaged to resemble bark or leaves.

- Great eared-nightjar, Eurostopodus macrotis
- Gray nightjar, Caprimulgus jotaka
- Sykes's nightjar, Caprimulgus mahrattensis (A)
- Large-tailed nightjar, Caprimulgus macrurus
- Indian nightjar, Caprimulgus asiaticus
- Savanna nightjar, Caprimulgus affinis

== Swifts ==
Order: Caprimulgiformes Family: Apodidae

Swifts are small birds which spend the majority of their lives flying. These birds have very short legs and never settle voluntarily on the ground, perching instead only on vertical surfaces. Many swifts have long swept-back wings which resemble a crescent or boomerang.

- White-rumped needletail, Zoonavena sylvatica (A)
- White-throated needletail, Hirundapus caudacutus
- Silver-backed needletail, Hirundapus cochinchinensis (A)
- Brown-backed needletail, Hirundapus giganteus
- Himalayan swiftlet, Aerodramus brevirostris
- Alpine swift, Apus melba
- Pacific swift, Apus pacificus (A)
- Blyth's swift, Apus leuconyx
- Little swift, Apus affinis
- House swift, Apus nipalensis
- Asian palm-swift, Cypsiurus balasiensis

== Treeswifts ==
Order: Caprimulgiformes Family: Hemiprocnidae

The treeswifts, also called crested swifts, are closely related to the true swifts. They differ from the other swifts in that they have crests, long forked tails and softer plumage.

- Crested treeswift, Hemiprocne coronata (A)

== Rails, gallinules, and coots ==
Order: Gruiformes Family: Rallidae

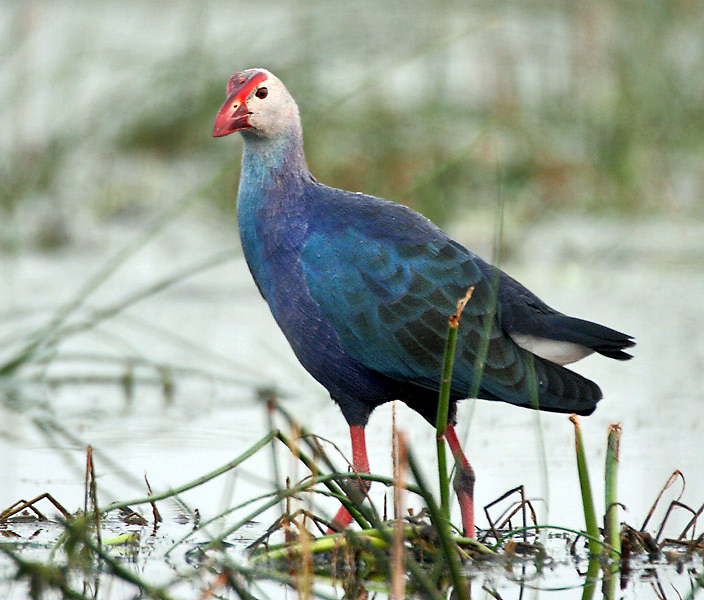
Grey-headed swamphen, Porphyrio poliocephalus

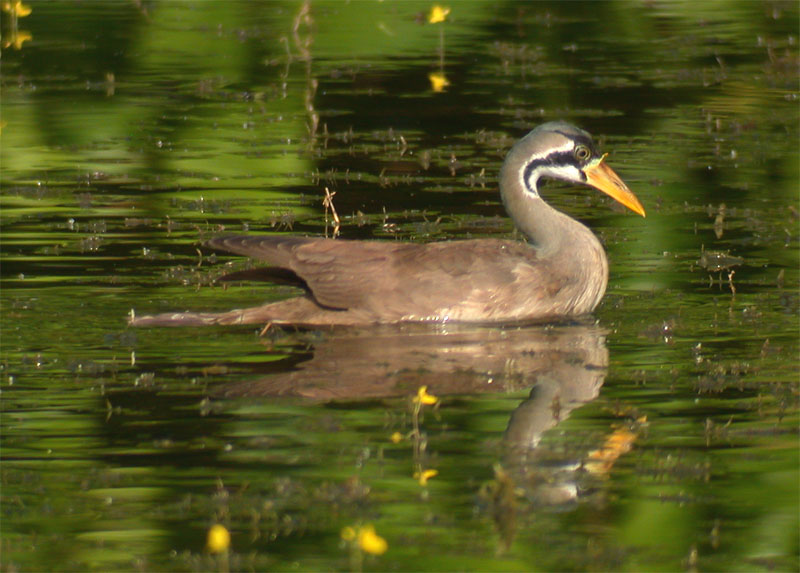
Masked finfoot, Heliopais personata

Rallidae is a large family of small to medium-sized birds which includes the rails, crakes, coots and gallinules. Typically they inhabit dense vegetation in damp environments near lakes, swamps or rivers. In general they are shy and secretive birds, making them difficult to observe. Most species have strong legs and long toes which are well adapted to soft uneven surfaces. They tend to have short, rounded wings and to be weak fliers.

- Brown-cheeked rail, Rallus indicus
- Slaty-breasted rail, Lewinia striata
- Spotted crake, Porzana porzana
- Eurasian moorhen, Gallinula chloropus
- Eurasian coot, Fulica atra
- Gray-headed swamphen, Porphyrio poliocephalus
- Watercock, Gallicrex cinerea
- White-breasted waterhen, Amaurornis phoenicurus
- Slaty-legged crake, Rallina eurizonoides
- Ruddy-breasted crake, Zapornia fusca
- Brown crake, Zapornia akool
- Baillon's crake, Zapornia pusilla
- Black-tailed crake, Zapornia bicolor

== Finfoots ==
Order: Gruiformes Family: Heliornithidae

Heliornithidae is a small family of tropical birds with webbed lobes on their feet similar to those of grebes and coots.

- Masked finfoot, Heliopais personata

== Cranes ==
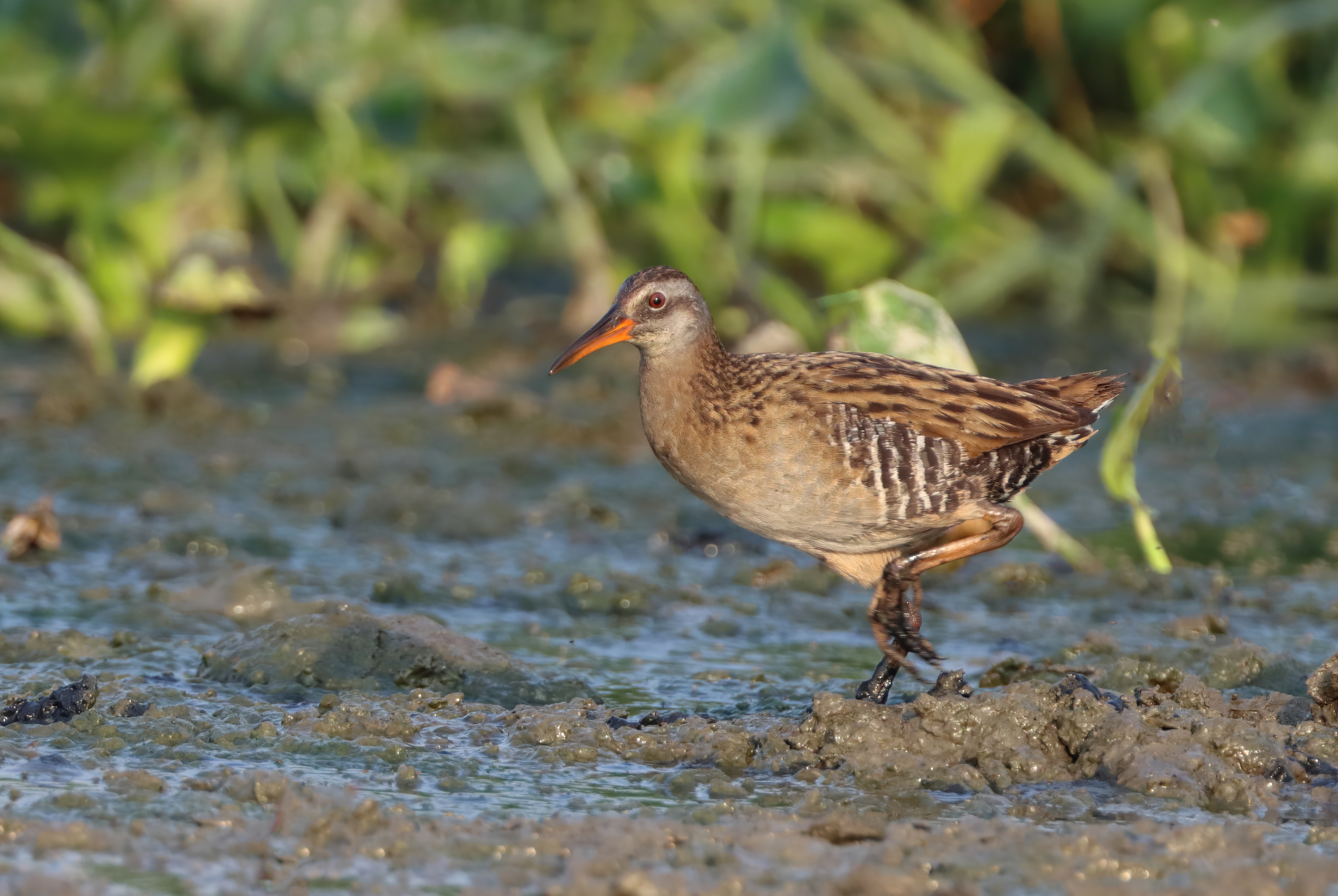
Brown-cheeked rail, Rallus indicus, in Chittagong

Order: Gruiformes Family: Gruidae

Cranes are large, long-legged and long-necked birds. Unlike the similar-looking but unrelated herons, cranes fly with necks outstretched, not pulled back. Most have elaborate and noisy courting displays or "dances".

- Demoiselle crane, Anthropoides antigone
- Sarus crane, Antigone antigone
- Common crane, Grus grus (A)

== Thick-knees ==
Order: Charadriiformes Family: Burhinidae

The stone-curlews are a group of largely tropical waders in the family Burhinidae. They are found worldwide within the tropical zone, with some species also breeding in temperate Europe and Australia. They are medium to large waders with strong black or yellow-black bills, large yellow eyes and cryptic plumage. Despite being classed as waders, most species have a preference for arid or semi-arid habitats.

- Indian thick-knee, Burhinus indicus
- Great thick-knee, Esacus recurvirostris

== Stilts and avocets ==
Order: Charadriiformes Family: Recurvirostridae

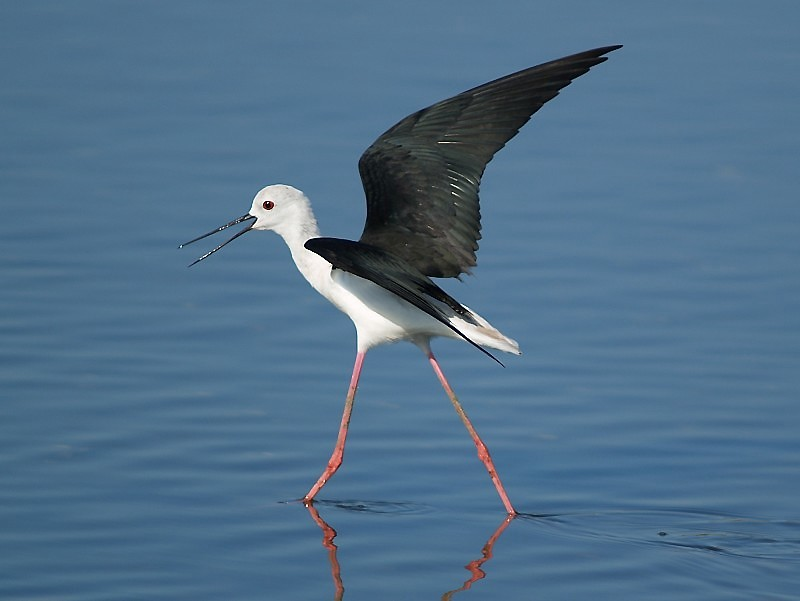
Black-winged stilt, Himantopus himantopus

Recurvirostridae is a family of large wading birds, which includes the avocets and stilts. The avocets have long legs and long up-curved bills. The stilts have extremely long legs and long, thin, straight bills. .

- Black-winged stilt, Himantopus himantopus
- Pied avocet, Recurvirostra avosetta

== Oystercatchers ==
Order: Charadriiformes Family: Haematopodidae

The oystercatchers are large and noisy plover-like birds, with strong bills used for smashing or prising open molluscs.

- Eurasian oystercatcher, Haematopus ostralegus (A)

== Plovers and lapwings ==
Order: Charadriiformes Family: Charadriidae

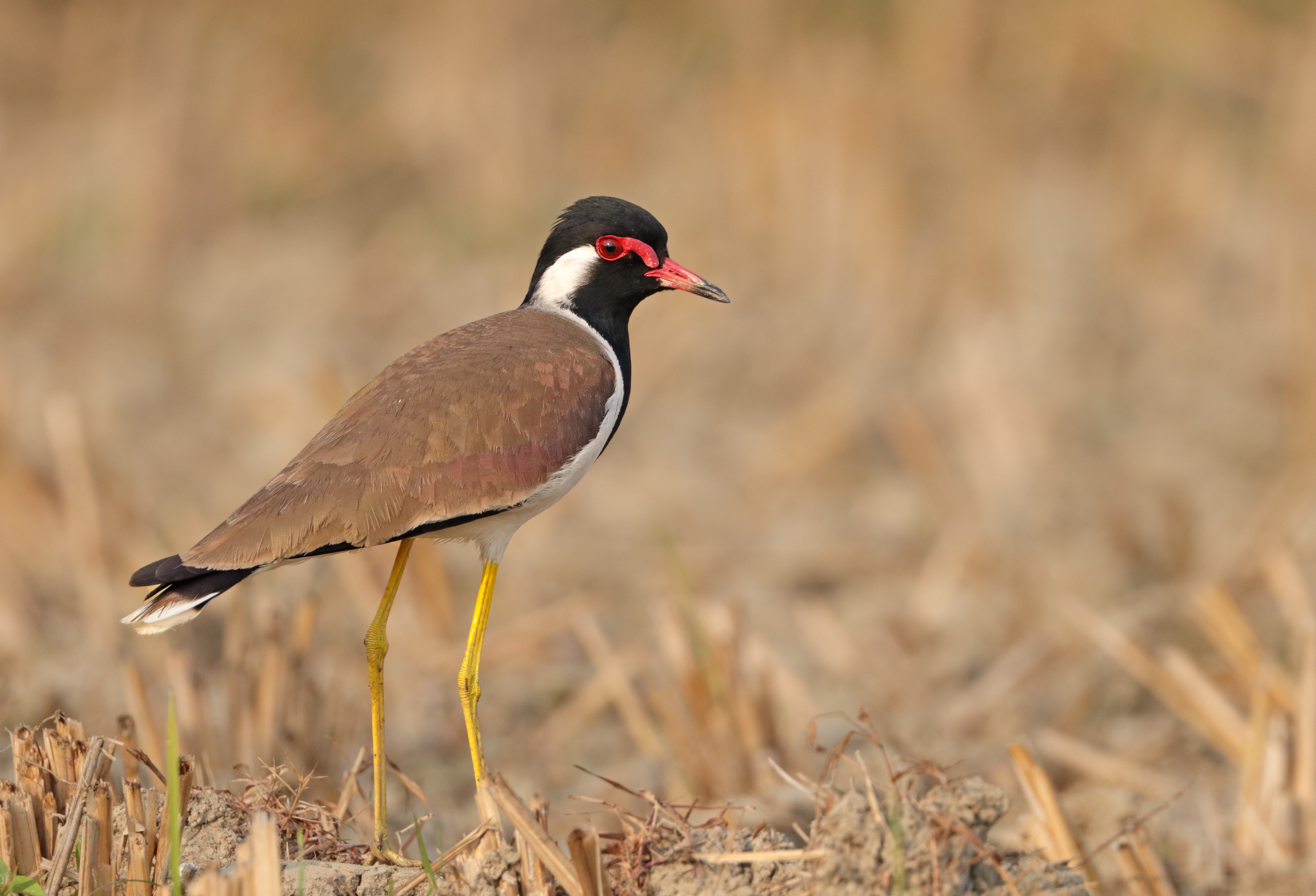
Red-wattled lapwing, Vanellus indicus

The family Charadriidae includes the plovers, dotterels and lapwings. They are small to medium-sized birds with compact bodies, short, thick necks and long, usually pointed, wings. They are found in open country worldwide, mostly in habitats near water.

- Black-bellied plover, Pluvialis squatarola
- Pacific golden-plover, Pluvialis fulva
- Northern lapwing, Vanellus vanellus
- River lapwing, Vanellus duvaucelii
- Yellow-wattled lapwing, Vanellus malabaricus
- Gray-headed lapwing, Vanellus cinereus
- Red-wattled lapwing, Vanellus indicus
- Sociable lapwing, Vanellus gregarius
- White-tailed lapwing, Vanellus leucurus
- Lesser sand-plover, Charadrius mongolus
- Greater sand-plover, Charadrius leschenaultii
- Kentish plover, Charadrius alexandrinus
- Common ringed plover, Charadrius hiaticula
- Long-billed plover, Charadrius placidus (A)
- Little ringed plover, Charadrius dubius
- Oriental plover, Charadrius veredus (A)

== Painted-snipes ==
Order: Charadriiformes Family: Rostratulidae

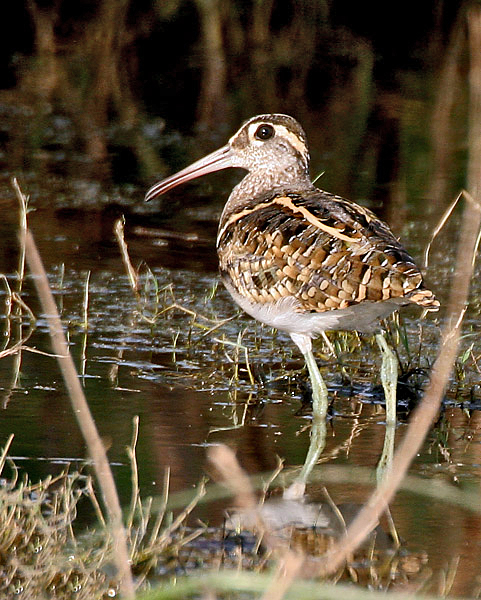
Greater painted-snipe, Rostratula benghalensis

Painted-snipe are short-legged, long-billed birds similar in shape to the true snipes, but more brightly coloured.

- Greater painted-snipe, Rostratula benghalensis

== Jacanas ==
Order: Charadriiformes Family: Jacanidae

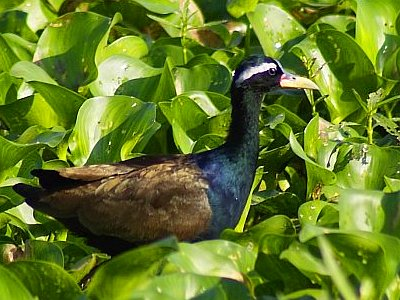
Bronze-winged jacana, Metopidius indicus

The jacanas are a group of tropical waders in the family Jacanidae. They are found throughout the tropics. They are identifiable by their huge feet and claws which enable them to walk on floating vegetation in the shallow lakes that are their preferred habitat.

- Pheasant-tailed jacana, Hydrophasianus chirurgus
- Bronze-winged jacana, Metopidius indicus

== Sandpipers and allies ==
Order: Charadriiformes Family: Scolopacidae

Scolopacidae is a large diverse family of small to medium-sized shorebirds including the sandpipers, curlews, godwits, shanks, tattlers, woodcocks, snipes, dowitchers and phalaropes. The majority of these species eat small invertebrates picked out of the mud or soil. Variation in length of legs and bills enables multiple species to feed in the same habitat, particularly on the coast, without direct competition for food.

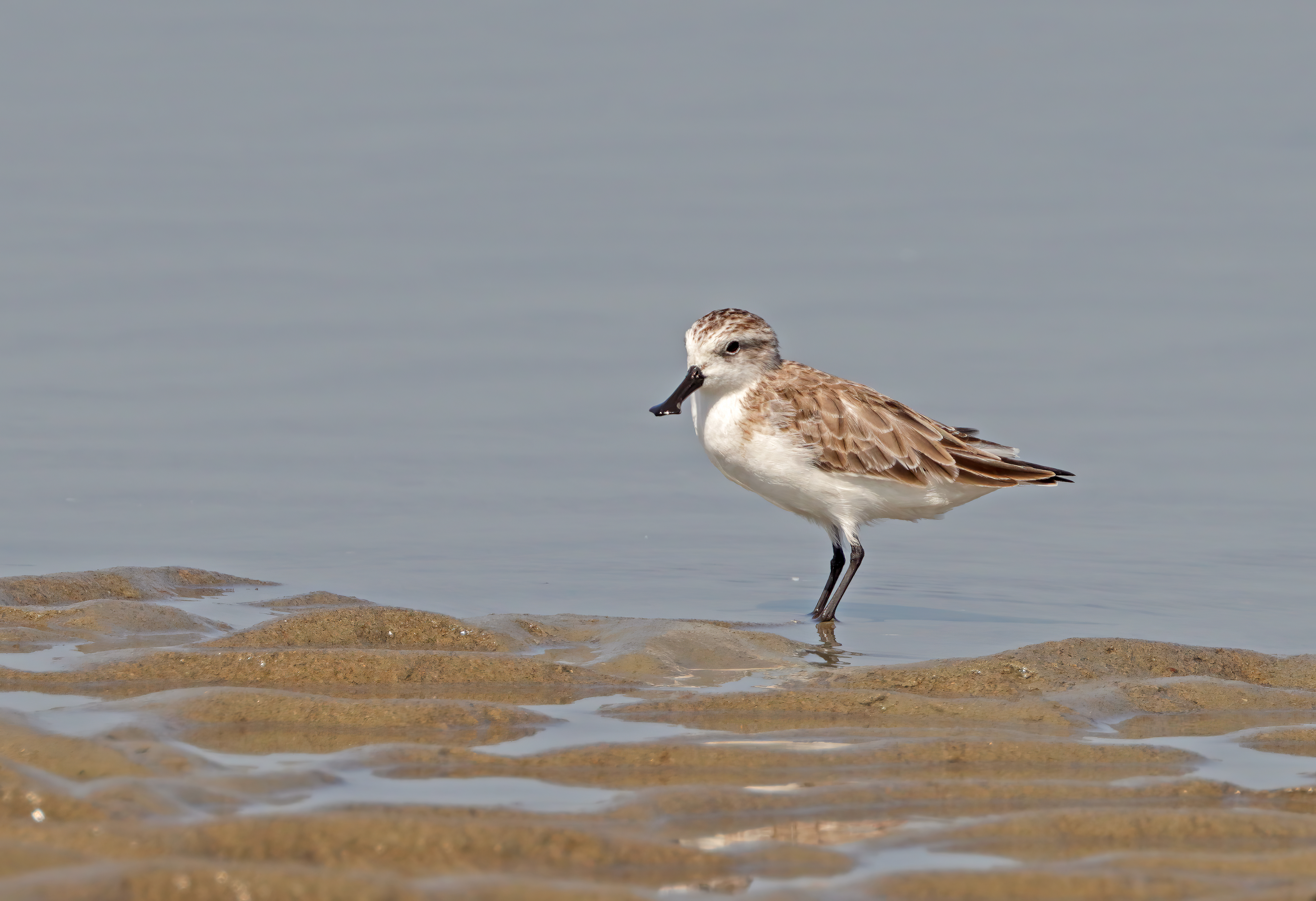
Spoon-billed sandpiper, Calidris pygmaea

- Whimbrel, Numenius phaeopus
- Far Eastern curlew, Numenius madagascariensis
- Eurasian curlew, Numenius arquata
- Bar-tailed godwit, Limosa lapponica
- Black-tailed godwit, Limosa limosa
- Ruddy turnstone, Arenaria interpres
- Great knot, Calidris tenuirostris
- Red knot, Calidris canutus
- Ruff, Calidris pugnax
- Broad-billed sandpiper, Calidris falcinellus
- Curlew sandpiper, Calidris ferruginea
- Temminck's stint, Calidris temminckii
- Long-toed stint, Calidris subminuta
- Spoon-billed sandpiper, Calidris pygmaea (A)
- Red-necked stint, Calidris ruficollis
- Sanderling, Calidris alba
- Dunlin, Calidris alpina
- Little stint, Calidris minuta
- Asian dowitcher, Limnodromus semipalmatus
- Long-billed dowitcher, Limnodromus scolopaceus (A)
- Jack snipe, Lymnocryptes minimus
- Eurasian woodcock, Scolopax rusticola
- Solitary snipe, Gallinago solitaria
- Wood snipe, Gallinago nemoricola
- Common snipe, Gallinago gallinago
- Pin-tailed snipe, Gallinago stenura
- Swinhoe's snipe, Gallinago megala
- Terek sandpiper, Xenus cinereus
- Red-necked phalarope, Phalaropus lobatus (A)
- Red phalarope, Phalaropus fulicarius (A)
- Common sandpiper, Actitis hypoleucos
- Green sandpiper, Tringa ochropus
- Gray-tailed tattler, Tringa brevipes
- Spotted redshank, Tringa erythropus
- Common greenshank, Tringa nebularia
- Nordmann's greenshank, Tringa guttifer
- Marsh sandpiper, Tringa stagnatilis
- Wood sandpiper, Tringa glareola
- Common redshank, Tringa totanus

== Buttonquails ==
Order: Charadriiformes Family: Turnicidae

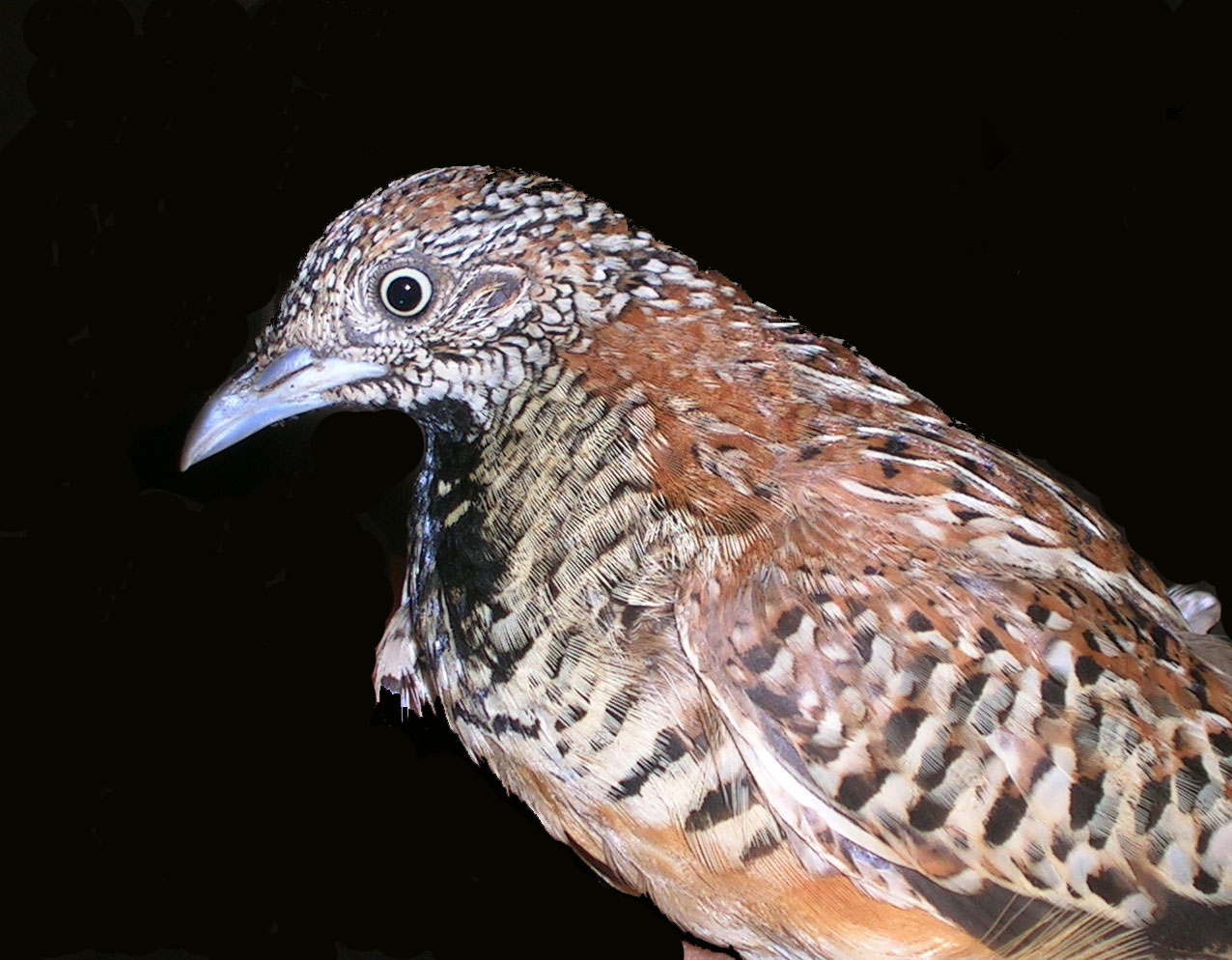
Barred buttonquail, Turnix suscitator taigoor

The buttonquails are small, drab, running birds which resemble the true quails. The female is the brighter of the sexes and initiates courtship. The male incubates the eggs and tends the young.

- Small buttonquail, Turnix sylvatica (Ex)
- Yellow-legged buttonquail, Turnix tanki (A)
- Barred buttonquail, Turnix suscitator

== Crab-plover ==
Order: Charadriiformes Family: Dromadidae

The crab-plover is related to the waders, but is the only member of its family. It resembles a plover but has very long grey legs and a strong black bill similar to that of a tern. It has black-and-white plumage, a long neck, partially webbed feet, and a bill designed for eating crabs.

- Crab-plover, Dromas ardeola

== Pratincoles and coursers ==
Order: Charadriiformes Family: Glareolidae

Glareolidae is a family of wading birds comprising the pratincoles, which have short legs, long pointed wings and long forked tails, and the coursers, which have long legs, short wings and long, pointed bills which curve downwards.

- Indian courser, Cursorius coromandelicus
- Collared pratincole, Glareola pratincola
- Oriental pratincole, Glareola maldivarum
- Small pratincole, Glareola lactea

== Skuas and jaegers ==
Order: Charadriiformes Family: Stercorariidae

The family Stercorariidae are, in general, medium to large birds, typically with grey or brown plumage, often with white markings on the wings. They nest on the ground in temperate and arctic regions and are long-distance migrants.

- Pomarine jaeger, Stercorarius pomarinus (A)
- Parasitic jaeger, Stercorarius parasiticus
- Long-tailed jaeger, Stercorarius longicaudus (A)

== Gulls, terns, and skimmers ==
Order: Charadriiformes Family: Laridae

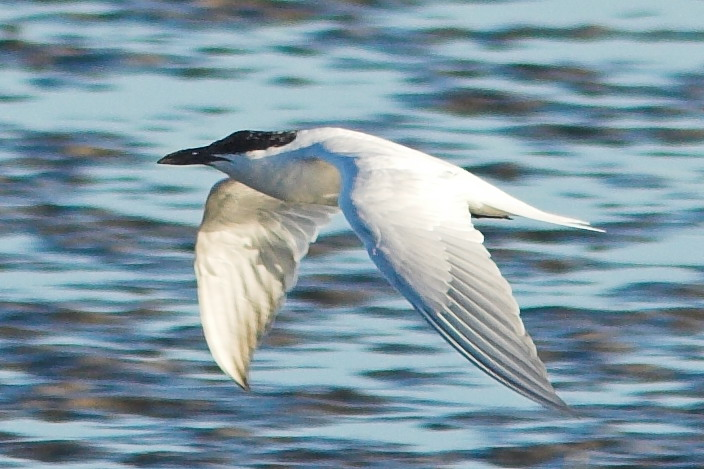
Gull-billed tern, Gelochelidon nilotica

Laridae is a family of medium to large seabirds, the gulls, terns, and skimmers. They are typically grey or white, often with black markings on the head or wings. They have stout, longish bills and webbed feet. Terns are a group of generally medium to large seabirds typically with grey or white plumage, often with black markings on the head. Most terns hunt fish by diving but some pick insects off the surface of fresh water. Terns are generally long-lived birds, with several species known to live in excess of 30 years. Skimmers are a small family of tropical tern-like birds. They have an elongated lower mandible which they use to feed by flying low over the water surface and skimming the water for small fish.

- Black-legged kittiwake, Rissa tridactyla (A)
- Slender-billed gull, Chroicocephalus genei (A)
- Black-headed gull, Chroicocephalus ridibundus
- Brown-headed gull, Chroicocephalus brunnicephalus
- Pallas's gull, Ichthyaetus ichthyaetus
- Caspian gull, Larus cachinnans
- Lesser black-backed gull, Larus fuscus
- Lesser noddy, Anous tenuirostris
- White tern, Gygis alba
- Sooty tern, Onychoprion fuscatus (A)
- Bridled tern, Onychoprion anaethetus (A)
- Little tern, Sternula albifrons
- Gull-billed tern, Gelochelidon nilotica
- Caspian tern, Hydroprogne caspia
- White-winged tern, Chlidonias leucopterus (A)
- Whiskered tern, Chlidonias hybrida
- Black-naped tern, Sterna sumatrana
- Common tern, Sterna hirundo
- Black-bellied tern, Sterna acuticauda (A)
- River tern, Sterna aurantia
- Great crested tern, Thalasseus bergii
- Sandwich tern, Thalasseus sandvicensis
- Lesser crested tern, Thalasseus bengalensis
- Indian skimmer, Rynchops albicollis

== Tropicbirds ==
Order: Phaethontiformes Family: Phaethontidae

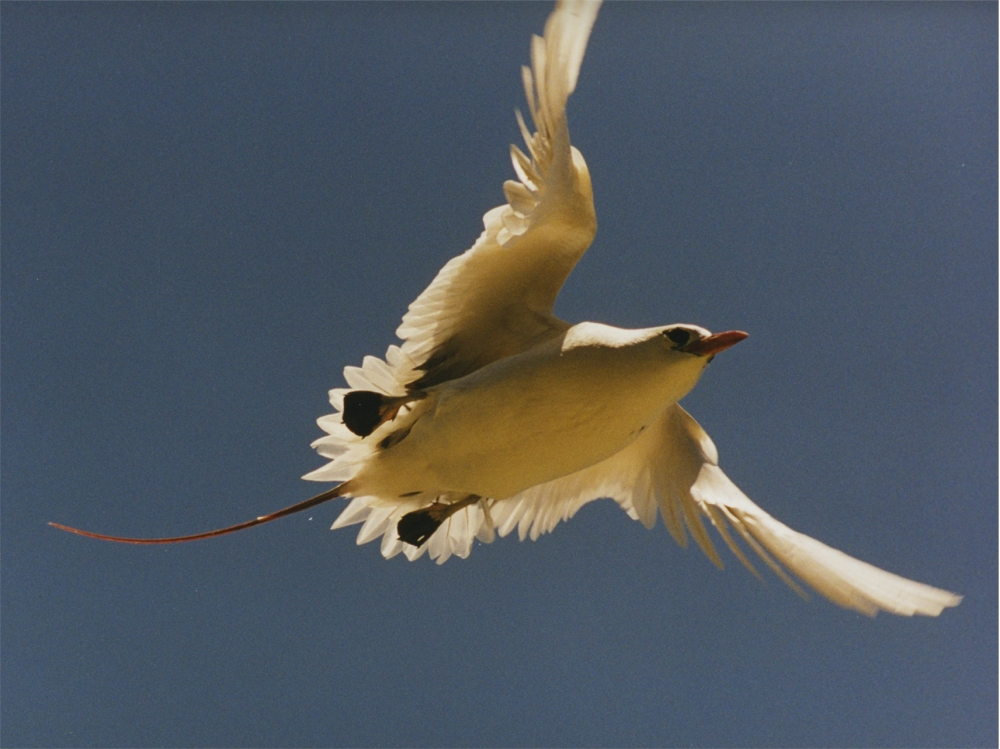
Red-tailed tropicbird, Phaethon rubricauda

Tropicbirds are slender white birds of tropical oceans, with exceptionally long central tail feathers. Their heads and long wings have black markings.

- Red-billed tropicbird, Phaethon aethereus (A)
- Red-tailed tropicbird, Phaethon rubricauda

== Southern storm-petrels ==
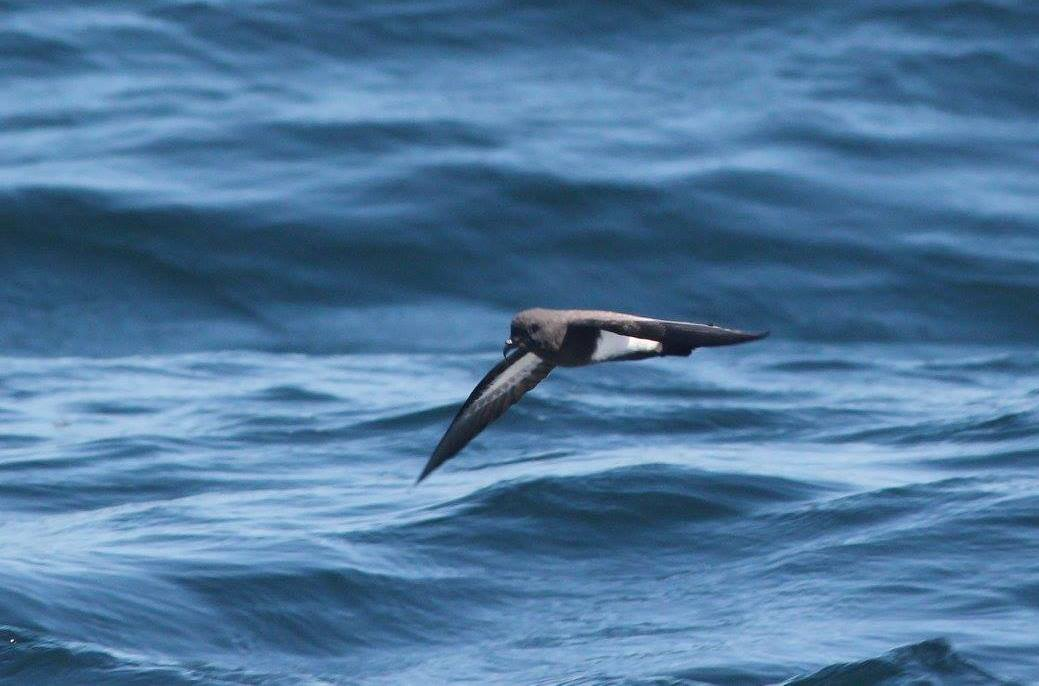
Black-bellied storm petrel, Fregetta tropica

Order: Procellariiformes Family: Oceanitidae

The southern storm-petrels are relatives of the petrels and are the smallest seabirds. They feed on planktonic crustaceans and small fish picked from the surface, typically while hovering. The flight is fluttering and sometimes bat-like.

- Wilson's storm-petrel, Oceanites oceanicus (A)
- Black-bellied storm-petrel, Fregetta tropica (A)

== Shearwaters and petrels ==
Order: Procellariiformes Family: Procellariidae

The procellariids are the main group of medium-sized "true petrels", characterised by united nostrils with medium septum and a long outer functional primary.

- Wedge-tailed shearwater, Ardenna pacifica (A)
- Short-tailed shearwater, Ardenna tenuirostris (A)

== Storks ==
Order: Ciconiiformes Family: Ciconiidae

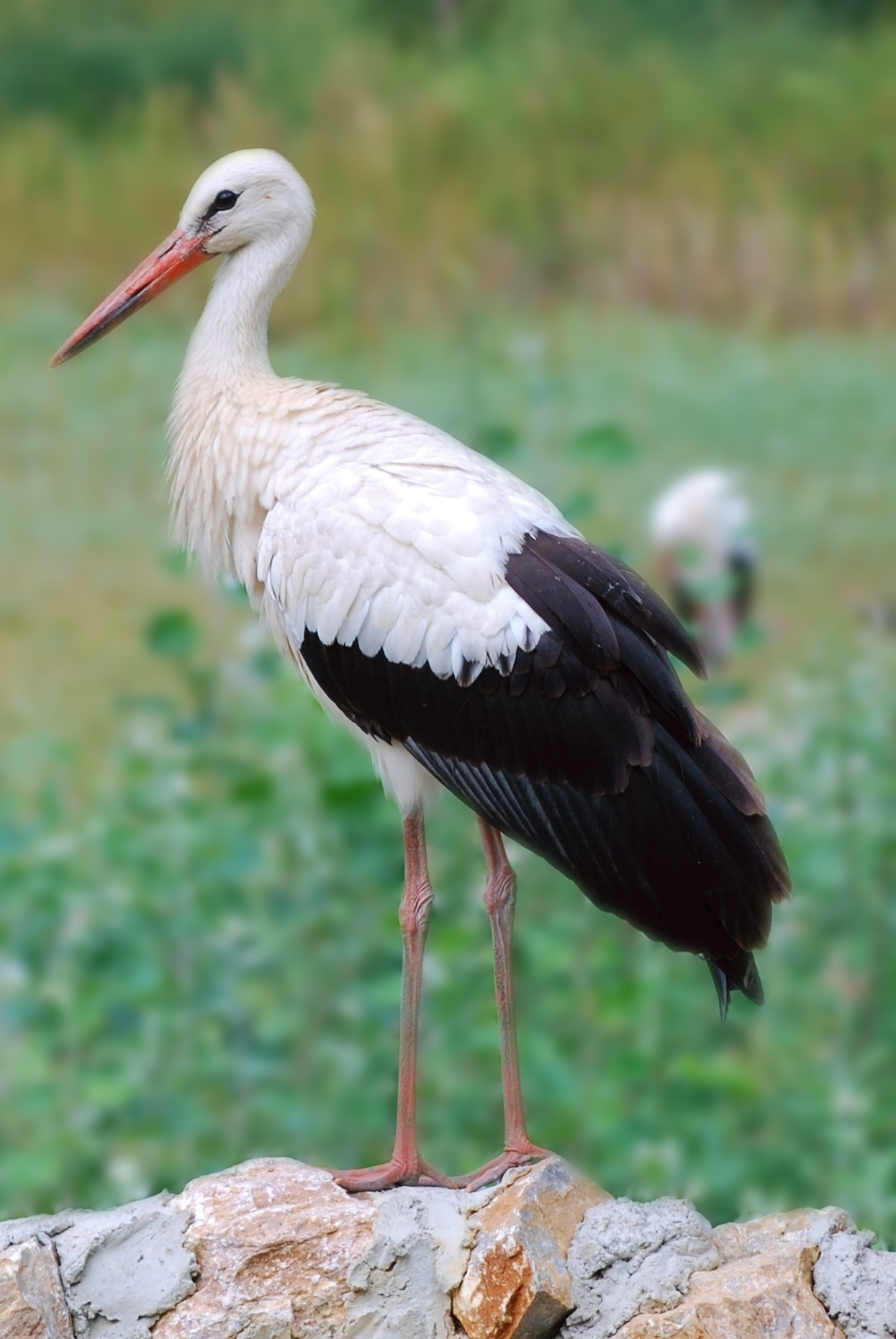
White stork, Ciconia ciconia (Bangla: sarosh, which is generic for all herons and storks)

Storks are large, long-legged, long-necked, wading birds with long, stout bills. Storks are mute, but bill-clattering is an important mode of communication at the nest. Their nests can be large and may be reused for many years. Many species are migratory.

- Asian openbill, Anastomus oscitans
- Black stork, Ciconia nigra
- Asian woolly-necked stork, Ciconia episcopus
- White stork, Ciconia ciconia
- Oriental stork, Ciconia boyciana
- Black-necked stork, Ephippiorhynchus asiaticus
- Lesser adjutant, Leptoptilos javanicus
- Greater adjutant, Leptoptilos dubius
- Painted stork, Mycteria leucocephala

== Frigatebirds ==
Order: Suliformes Family: Fregatidae

Frigatebirds are large seabirds usually found over tropical oceans. They are large, black-and-white, or completely black, with long wings and deeply forked tails. The males have coloured inflatable throat pouches. They do not swim or walk and cannot take off from a flat surface. Having the largest wingspan-to-body-weight ratio of any bird, they are essentially aerial, able to stay aloft for more than a week.

- Lesser frigatebird, Fregata ariel (A)

== Boobies and gannets ==
Order: Suliformes Family: Sulidae

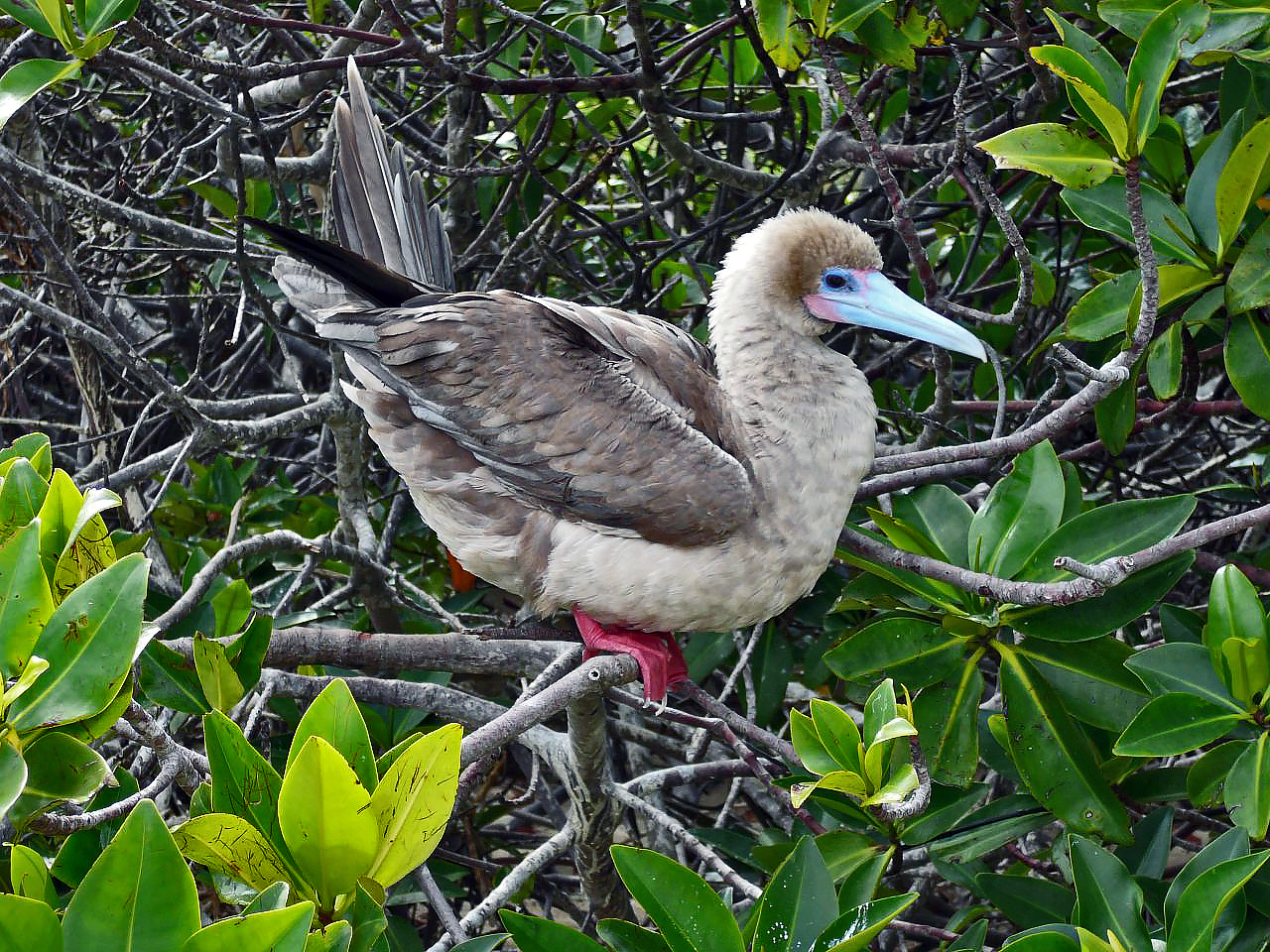
Red-footed booby, Sula sula

The sulids comprise the gannets and boobies. Both groups are medium to large coastal seabirds that plunge-dive for fish.

- Masked booby, Sula dactylatra (A)
- Red-footed booby, Sula sula (A)

== Anhingas ==
Order: Suliformes Family: Anhingidae

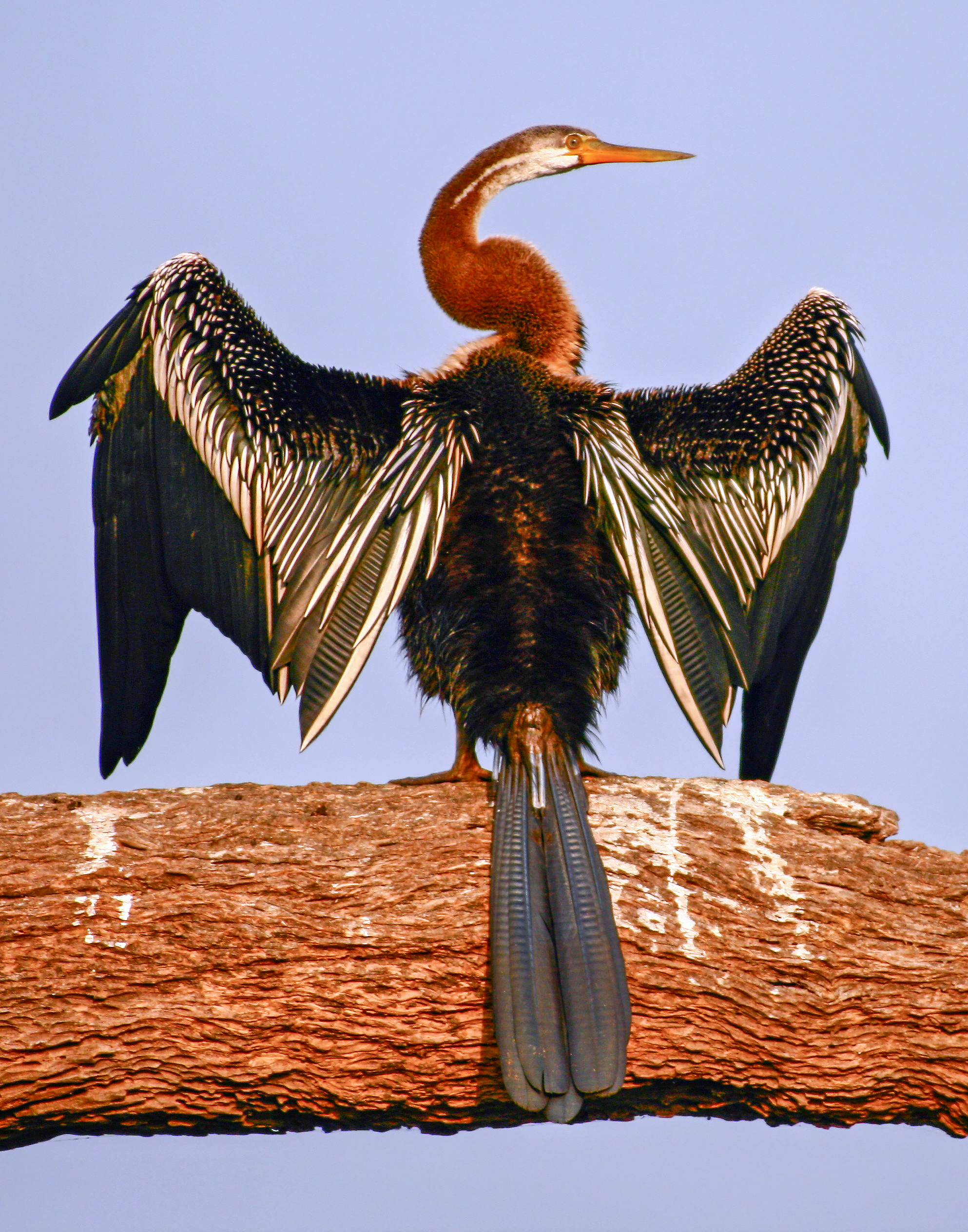
Oriental darter, Anhinga melanogaster

Anhingas are often called "snake-birds" because of their long thin neck, which gives a snake-like appearance when they swim with their bodies submerged. The males have black and dark-brown plumage, an erectile crest on the nape and a larger bill than the female. The females have much paler plumage especially on the neck and underparts. The darters have completely webbed feet and their legs are short and set far back on the body. Their plumage is somewhat permeable, like that of cormorants, and they spread their wings to dry after diving.

- Oriental darter, Anhinga melanogaster

== Cormorants and shags ==
Order: Suliformes Family: Phalacrocoracidae

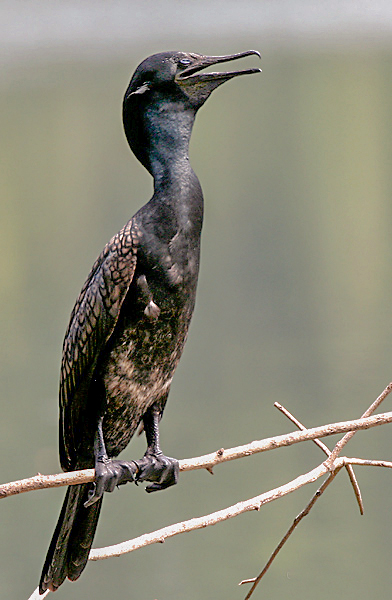
Indian cormorant, Phalacrocorax fuscicollis (Bangla: pankure)

Phalacrocoracidae is a family of medium to large coastal, fish-eating seabirds that includes cormorants and shags. Plumage colouration varies, with the majority having mainly dark plumage, some species being black-and-white and a few being colourful.

- Little cormorant, Microcarbo niger
- Great cormorant, Phalacrocorax carbo
- Indian cormorant, Phalacrocorax fuscicollis

== Pelicans ==
Order: Pelecaniformes Family: Pelecanidae

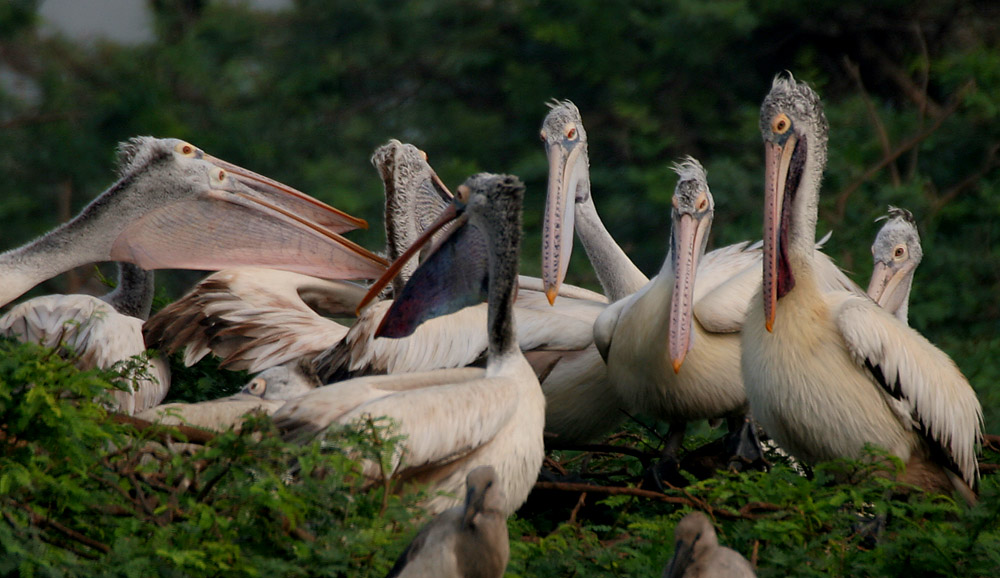
Spot-billed pelican, Pelecanus philippensis (Bangla: sarosh)

Pelicans are large water birds with a distinctive pouch under their beak. As with other members of the order Pelecaniformes, they have webbed feet with four toes.

- Great white pelican, Pelecanus onocrotalus
- Spot-billed pelican, Pelecanus philippensis
- Dalmatian pelican, Pelecanus crispus (A) (Ex?)

== Herons, egrets, and bitterns ==
Order: Pelecaniformes Family: Ardeidae

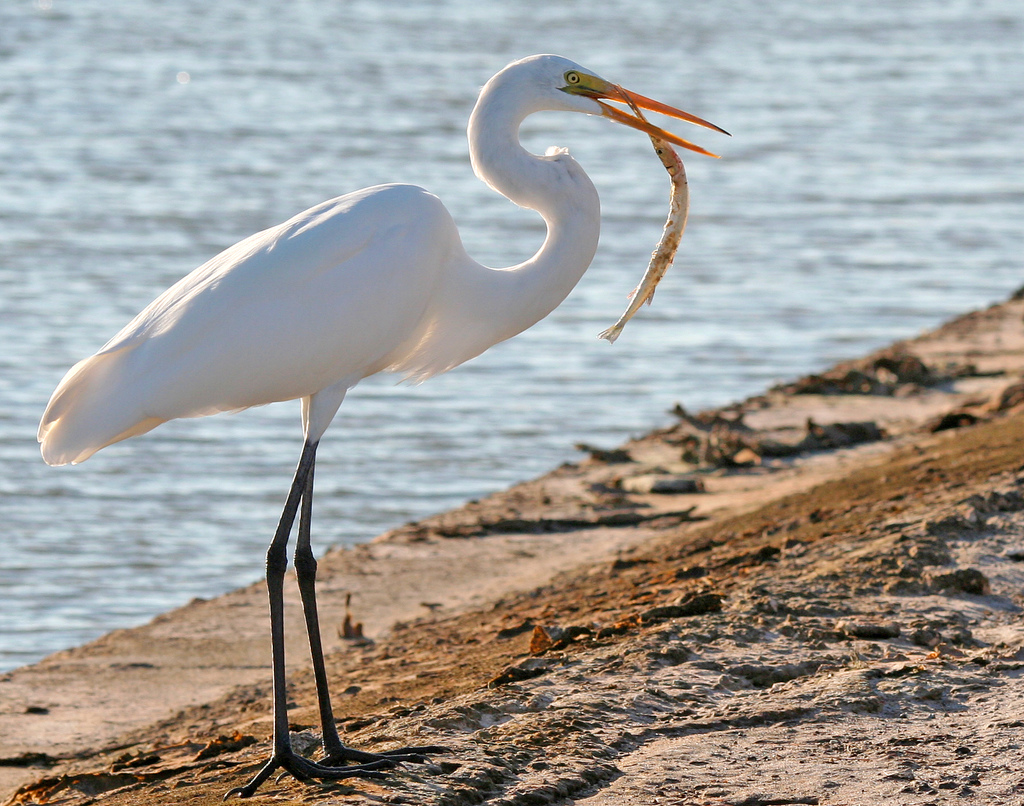
Great egret, Ardea alba (Bangla: sarosh)

The family Ardeidae contains the bitterns, herons and egrets. Herons and egrets are medium to large wading birds with long necks and legs. Bitterns tend to be shorter necked and more wary. Members of Ardeidae fly with their necks retracted, unlike other long-necked birds such as storks, ibises and spoonbills. (Note: in Bangla short-legged, short beaked herons and egrets are called bok, all other herons egrets and storks are generically called sarosh)

- Great bittern, Botaurus stellaris (A)
- Yellow bittern, Ixobrychus sinensis
- Little bittern, Ixobrychus minutus (Ex) (Note: IUCN does not consider the species extirpated or even present in Bangladesh.)
- Cinnamon bittern, Ixobrychus cinnamomeus
- Black bittern, Ixobrychus flavicollis
- Gray heron, Ardea cinerea
- White-bellied heron, Ardea insignis (Ex?)
- Goliath heron, Ardea goliath (A)
- Purple heron, Ardea purpurea
- Great egret, Ardea alba
- Intermediate egret, Ardea intermedia
- Little egret, Egretta garzetta
- Pacific reef-heron, Egretta sacra (A)
- Cattle egret, Bubulcus ibis
- Indian pond-heron, Ardeola grayii
- Chinese pond-heron, Ardeola bacchus
- Striated heron, Butorides striata
- Black-crowned night-heron, Nycticorax nycticorax
- White-eared night-heron, Gorsachius magnificus (A)
- Malayan night-heron, Gorsachius melanolophus

== Ibises and spoonbills ==
Order: Pelecaniformes Family: Threskiornithidae

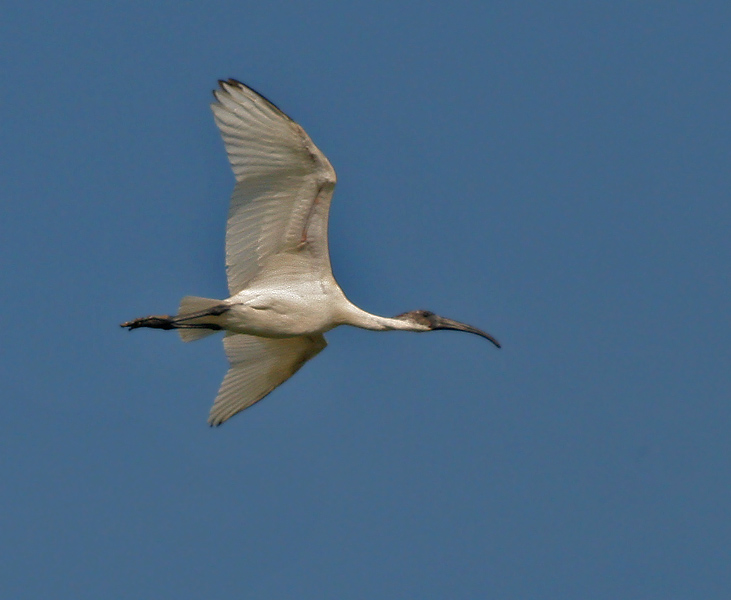
Black-headed ibis, Threskiornis melanocephalus

Threskiornithidae is a family of large terrestrial and wading birds which includes the ibises and spoonbills. They have long, broad wings with 11 primary and about 20 secondary feathers. They are strong fliers and despite their size and weight, very capable soarers.

- Glossy ibis, Plegadis falcinellus (A)
- Black-headed ibis, Threskiornis melanocephalus
- Red-naped ibis, Pseudibis papillosa
- Eurasian spoonbill, Platalea leucorodia

== Osprey ==
Order: Accipitriformes Family: Pandionidae

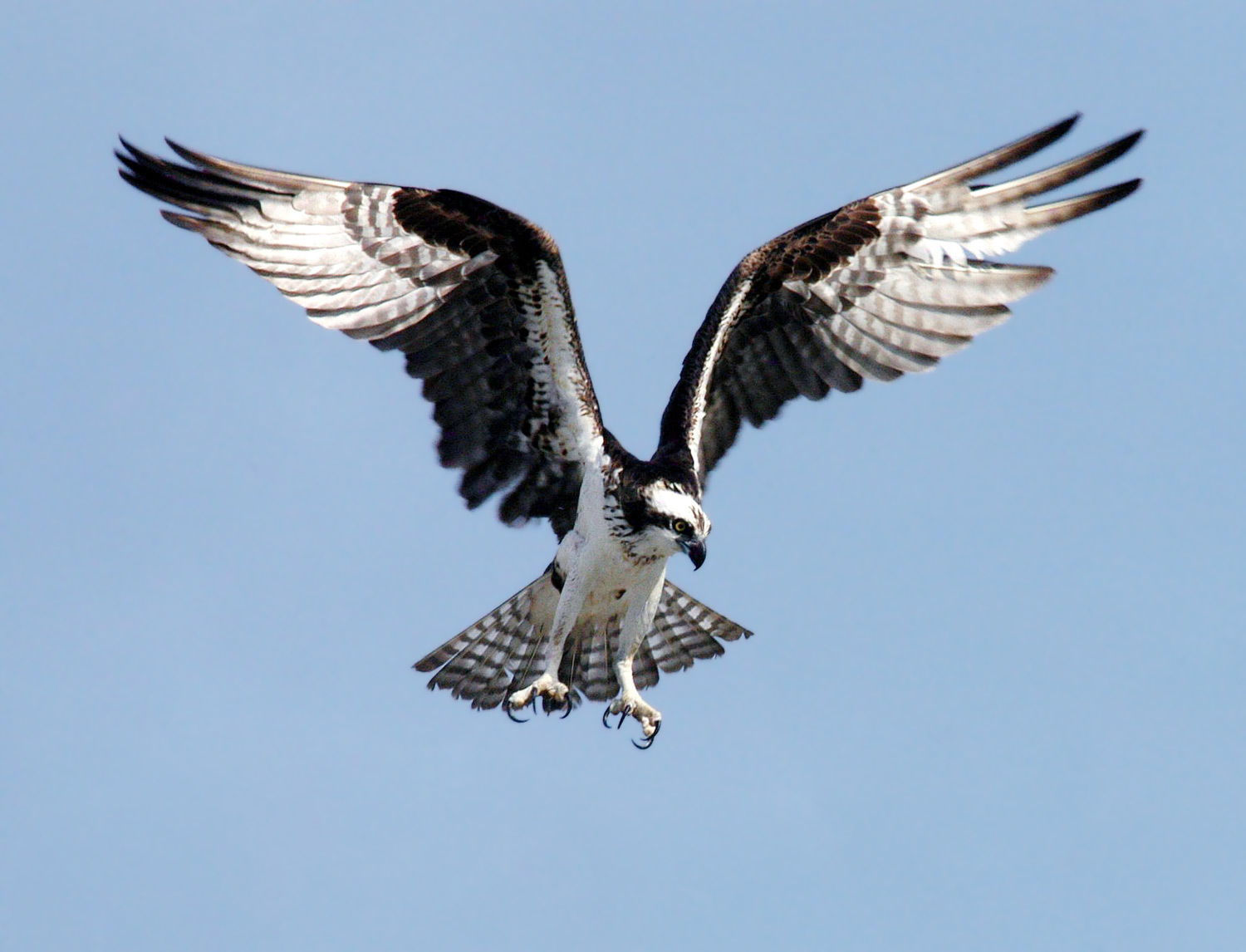
Osprey, Pandion haliaetus

The family Pandionidae contains only one species, the osprey. The osprey is a medium-large raptor which is a specialist fish-eater with a worldwide distribution.

- Osprey, Pandion haliaetus

== Hawks, eagles, and kites ==
Order: Accipitriformes Family: Accipitridae

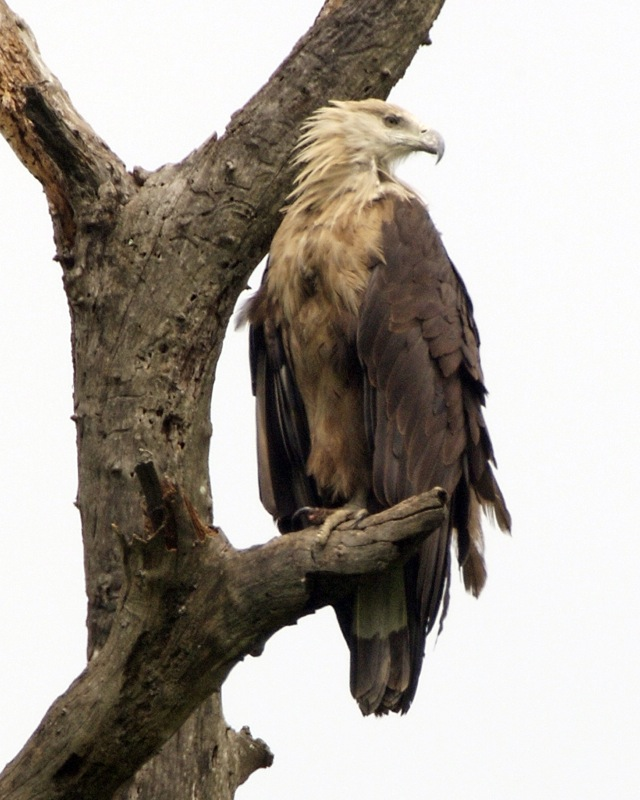
Pallas's fish eagle, Haliaeetus leucoryphus (Bangla: chil)

Accipitridae is a family of birds of prey, which includes hawks, eagles, kites, harriers and Old World vultures. These birds have powerful hooked beaks for tearing flesh from their prey, strong legs, powerful talons and keen eyesight.

- Black-winged kite, Elanus caeruleus
- Egyptian vulture, Neophron percnopterus
- Oriental honey-buzzard, Pernis ptilorhynchus
- Jerdon's baza, Aviceda jerdoni
- Black baza, Aviceda leuphotes
- Red-headed vulture, Sarcogyps calvus
- Cinereous vulture, Aegypius monachus (A)
- White-rumped vulture, Gyps bengalensis
- Indian vulture, Gyps indicus
- Slender-billed vulture, Gyps tenuirostris
- Himalayan griffon, Gyps himalayensis (A)
- Eurasian griffon, Gyps fulvus (A)
- Crested serpent-eagle, Spilornis cheela
- Short-toed snake-eagle, Circaetus gallicus (A)
- Changeable hawk-eagle, Nisaetus cirrhatus
- Mountain hawk-eagle, Nisaetus nipalensis (A)
- Rufous-bellied eagle, Lophotriorchis kienerii (A)
- Black eagle, Ictinaetus malaiensis (A)
- Indian spotted eagle, Clanga hastata
- Greater spotted eagle, Clanga clanga
- Booted eagle, Hieraaetus pennatus
- Tawny eagle, Aquila rapax
- Steppe eagle, Aquila nipalensis
- Imperial eagle, Aquila heliaca (A)
- Bonelli's eagle, Aquila fasciata
- White-eyed buzzard, Butastur teesa
- Eurasian marsh-harrier, Circus aeruginosus
- Eastern marsh-harrier, Circus spilonotus
- Hen harrier, Circus cyaneus
- Pallid harrier, Circus macrourus
- Pied harrier, Circus melanoleucos
- Montagu's harrier, Circus pygargus (A)
- Crested goshawk, Accipiter trivirgatus
- Shikra, Accipiter badius
- Japanese sparrowhawk, Accipiter gularis (A)
- Besra, Accipiter virgatus
- Eurasian sparrowhawk, Accipiter nisus
- Northern goshawk, Accipiter gentilis (A)
- Black kite, Milvus migrans
- Brahminy kite, Haliastur indus
- White-tailed eagle, Haliaeetus albicilla (A)
- Pallas's fish-eagle, Haliaeetus leucoryphus
- White-bellied sea-eagle, Haliaeetus leucogaster
- Lesser fish-eagle, Haliaeetus humilis
- Gray-headed fish-eagle, Haliaeetus ichthyaetus
- Common buzzard, Buteo buteo
- Eastern buzzard, Buteo japonicus (A)
- Long-legged buzzard, Buteo rufinus

== Barn owls ==
Order: Strigiformes Family: Tytonidae

Barn owls are medium to large owls with large heads and characteristic heart-shaped faces. They have long strong legs with powerful talons.

- Australasian grass-owl, Tyto longimembris
- Eastern barn owl, Tyto javanica

== Owls ==
Order: Strigiformes Family: Strigidae

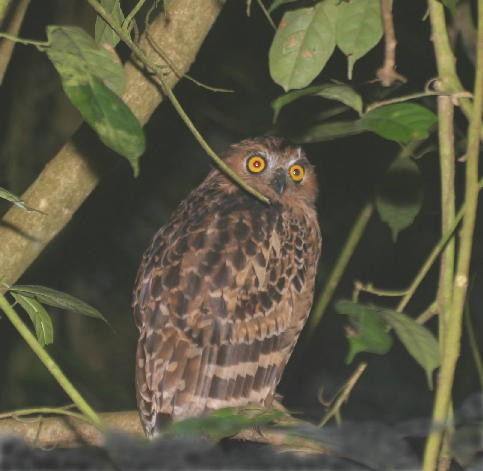
Buffy fish owl, Ketupa ketupu (Bangla: pecha)

The typical owls are small to large solitary nocturnal birds of prey. They have large forward-facing eyes and ears, a hawk-like beak and a conspicuous circle of feathers around each eye called a facial disk.

- Mountain scops-owl, Otus spilocephalus
- Indian scops-owl, Otus bakkamoena
- Collared scops-owl, Otus lettia
- Oriental scops-owl, Otus sunia
- Eurasian eagle-owl, Bubo bubo
- Rock eagle-owl, Bubo bengalensis
- Spot-bellied eagle-owl, Bubo nipalensis
- Dusky eagle-owl, Bubo coromandus
- Brown fish-owl, Ketupa zeylonensis
- Tawny fish-owl, Ketupa flavipes
- Buffy fish-owl, Ketupa ketupu (A)
- Collared owlet, Taenioptynx brodiei
- Asian barred owlet, Glaucidium cuculoides
- Jungle owlet, Glaucidium radiatum
- Spotted owlet, Athene brama
- Mottled wood-owl, Strix ocellata
- Brown wood-owl, Strix leptogrammica
- Short-eared owl, Asio flammeus
- Brown boobook, Ninox scutulata

== Trogons ==
Order: Trogoniformes Family: Trogonidae

The family Trogonidae includes trogons and quetzals. Found in tropical woodlands worldwide, they feed on insects and fruit, and their broad bills and weak legs reflect their diet and arboreal habits. Although their flight is fast, they are reluctant to fly any distance. Trogons have soft, often colourful, feathers with distinctive male and female plumage.

- Red-headed trogon, Harpactes erythrocephalus

== Hoopoes ==
Order: Bucerotiformes Family: Upupidae

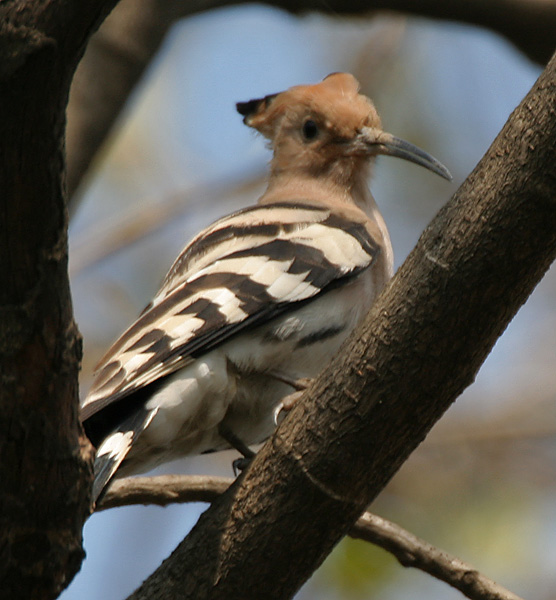
Eurasian hoopoe, Upupa epops

Hoopoes have black, white and orangey-pink colouring with a large erectile crest on their head.

- Eurasian hoopoe, Upupa epops

== Hornbills ==
Order: Bucerotiformes Family: Bucerotidae

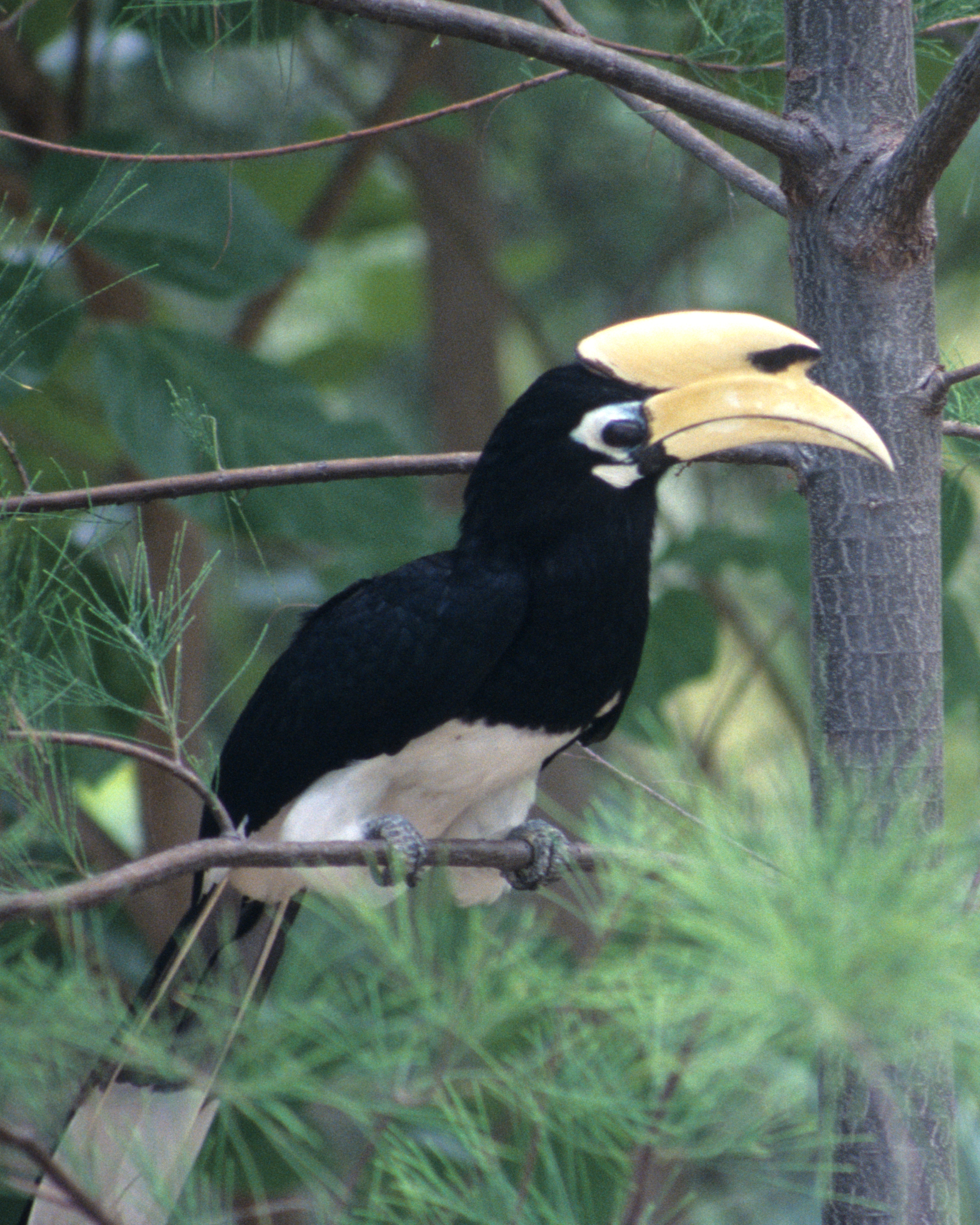
Oriental pied-hornbill, Anthracoceros albirostris

Hornbills are a group of birds whose bill is shaped like a cow's horn, but without a twist, sometimes with a casque on the upper mandible. Frequently, the bill is brightly coloured.

- Great hornbill, Buceros bicornis
- Indian gray hornbill, Ocyceros birostris (Ex)
- Oriental pied-hornbill, Anthracoceros albirostris
- Rufous-necked hornbill, Aceros nipalensis
- Wreathed hornbill, Rhyticeros undulatus (A)

== Kingfishers ==
Order: Coraciiformes Family: Alcedinidae

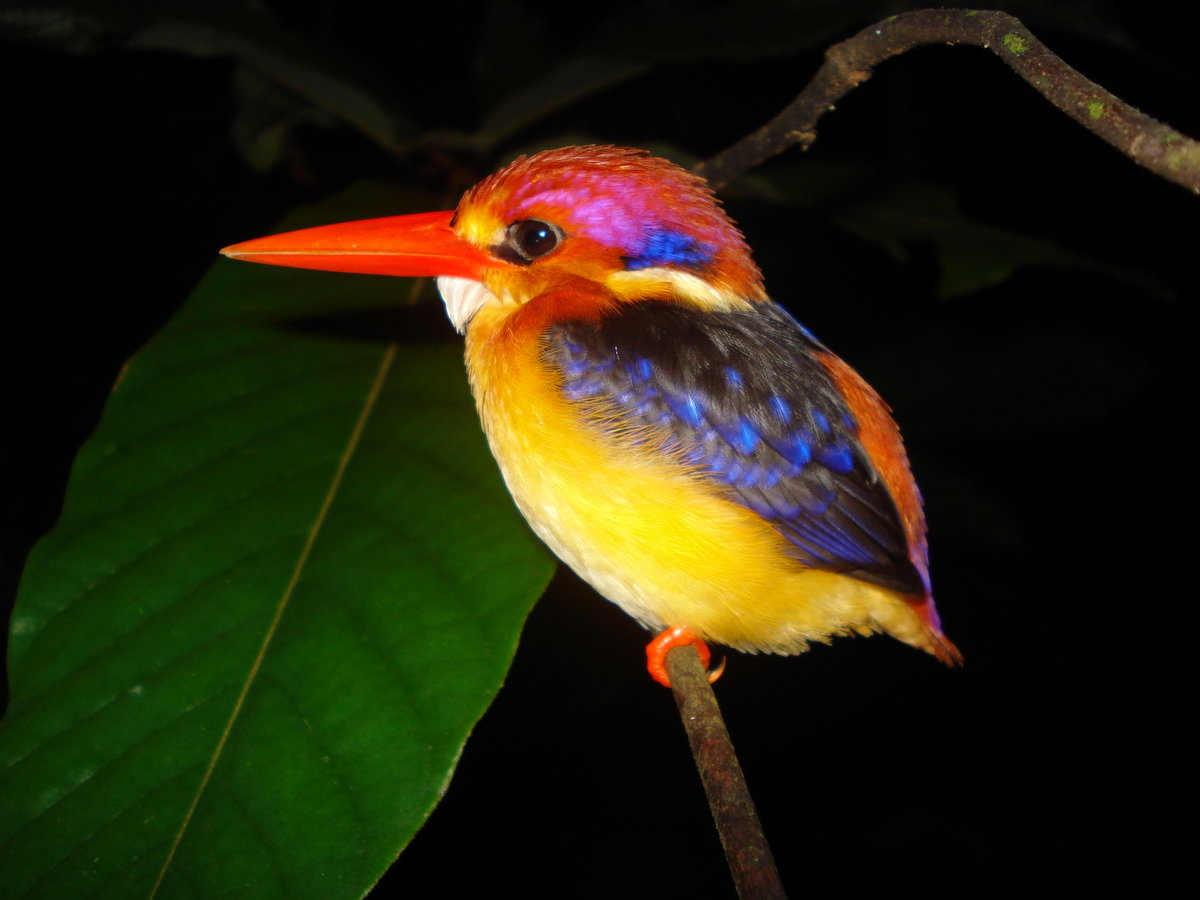
Black-backed dwarf-kingfisher, Ceyx erithacus

Kingfishers are medium-sized birds with large heads, long, pointed bills, short legs, and stubby tails.

- Blyth's kingfisher, Alcedo hercules (A)
- Common kingfisher, Alcedo atthis
- Blue-eared kingfisher, Alcedo meninting
- Black-backed dwarf-kingfisher, Ceyx erithacus
- Brown-winged kingfisher, Pelargopsis amauropterus
- Stork-billed kingfisher, Pelargopsis capensis
- Ruddy kingfisher, Halcyon coromanda
- White-throated kingfisher, Halcyon smyrnensis
- Black-capped kingfisher, Halcyon pileata
- Collared kingfisher, Todirhamphus chloris
- Crested kingfisher, Megaceryle lugubris
- Pied kingfisher, Ceryle rudis

== Bee-eaters ==
Order: Coraciiformes Family: Meropidae

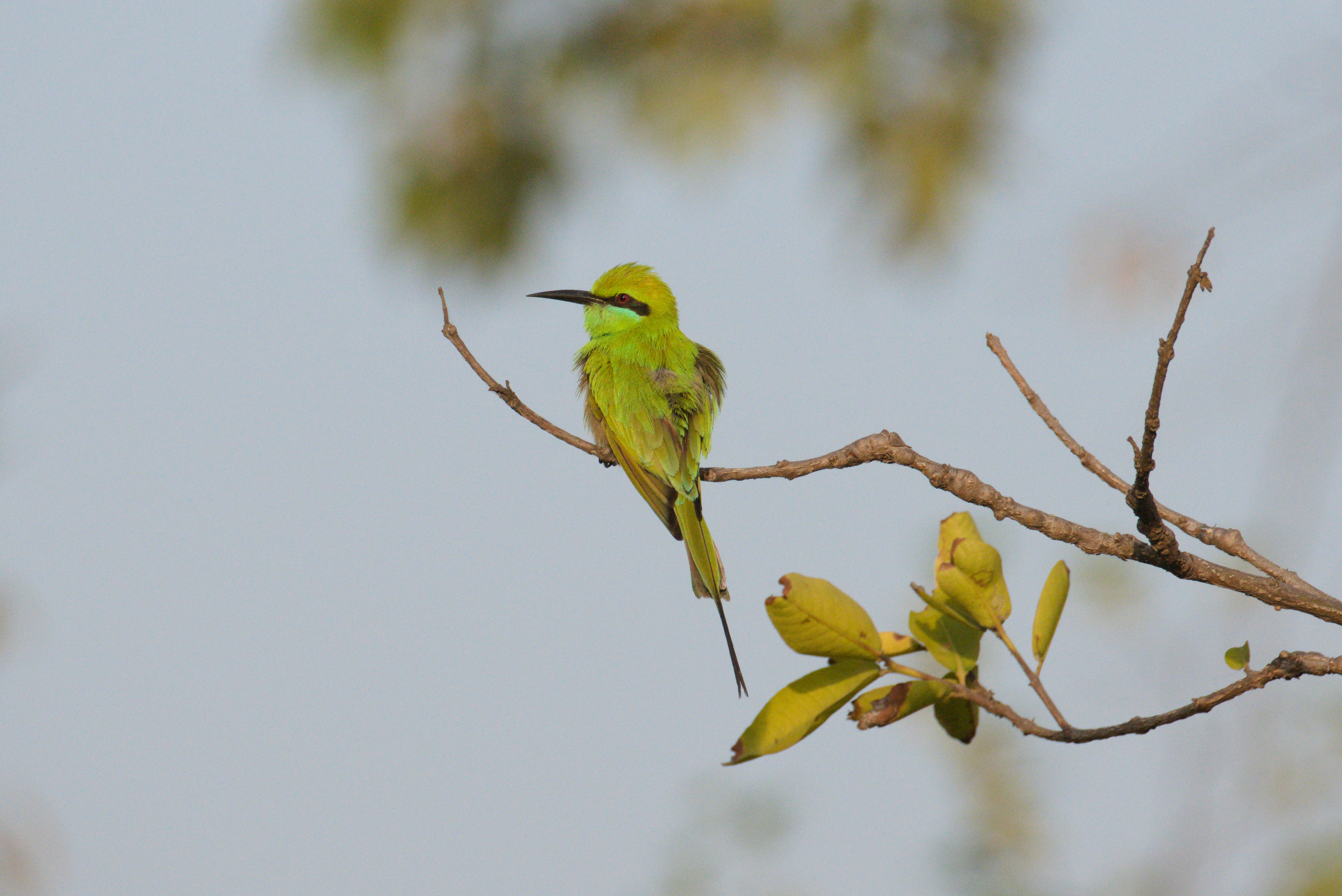
Asian green bee-eater in Nasirpur Patiala

The bee-eaters are a group of near passerine birds in the family Meropidae. Most species are found in Africa but others occur in southern Europe, Madagascar, Australia and New Guinea. They are characterised by richly coloured plumage, slender bodies and usually elongated central tail feathers. All are colourful and have long downturned bills and pointed wings, which give them a swallow-like appearance when seen from afar.

- Blue-bearded bee-eater, Nyctyornis athertoni
- Asian green bee-eater, Merops orientalis
- Blue-tailed bee-eater, Merops philippinus
- Chestnut-headed bee-eater, Merops leschenaulti

== Rollers ==
Order: Coraciiformes Family: Coraciidae

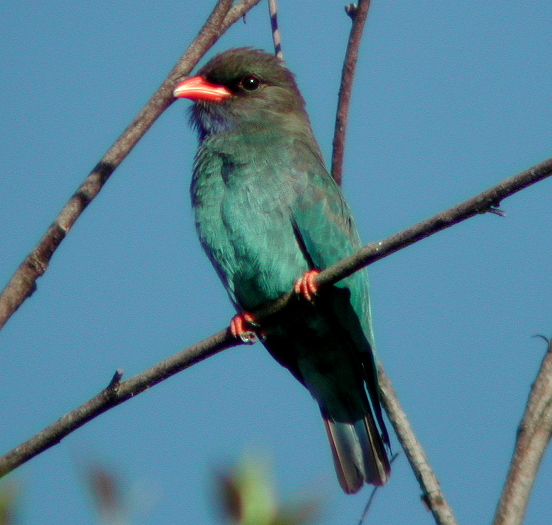
Dollarbird, Eurystomus orientalis

Rollers resemble crows in size and build, but are more closely related to the kingfishers and bee-eaters. They share the colourful appearance of those groups with blues and browns predominating. The two inner front toes are connected, but the outer toe is not.

- Indian roller, Coracias benghalensis
- Indochinese roller, Coracias affinis
- Dollarbird, Eurystomus orientalis

== Asian barbets ==
Order: Piciformes Family: Megalaimidae

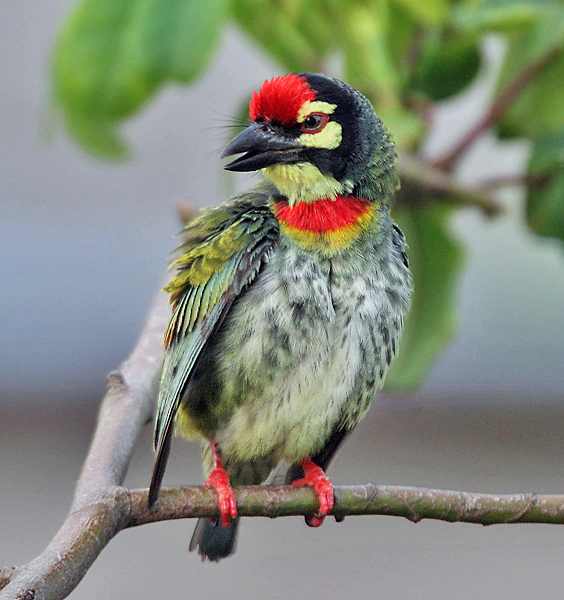
Coppersmith barbet, Psilopogon haemacephalus

The Asian barbets are plump birds, with short necks and large heads. They get their name from the bristles which fringe their heavy bills. Most species are brightly coloured.

- Coppersmith barbet, Psilopogon haemacephalus
- Blue-eared barbet, Psilopogon duvaucelii
- Great barbet, Psilopogon virens
- Lineated barbet, Psilopogon lineatus
- Brown-headed barbet, Psilopogon zeylanicus
- Golden-throated barbet, Psilopogon franklinii
- Blue-throated barbet, Psilopogon asiaticus

== Woodpeckers ==
Order: Piciformes Family: Picidae

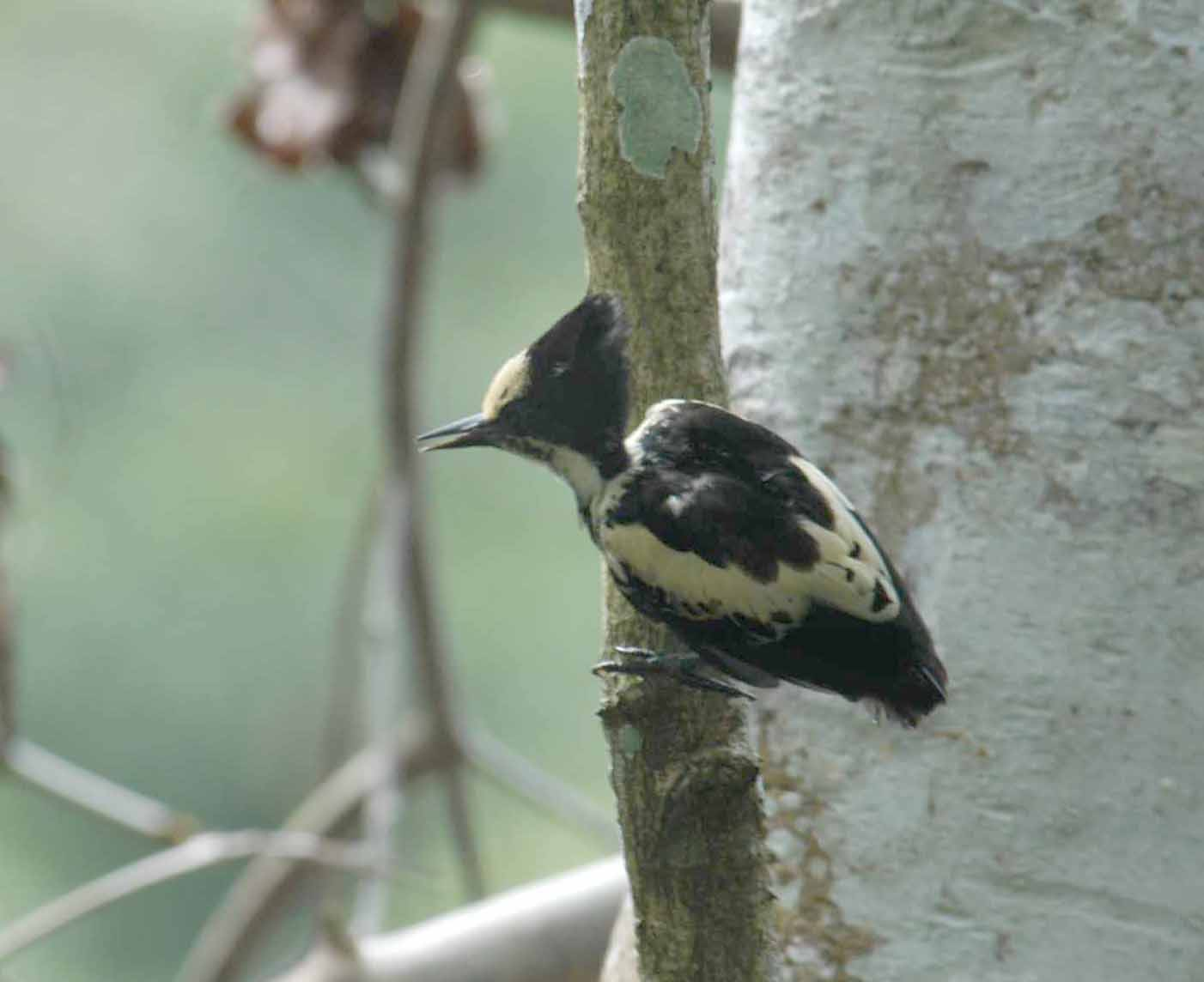
Heart-spotted woodpecker, Hemicircus canente

Woodpeckers are small to medium-sized birds with chisel-like beaks, short legs, stiff tails and long tongues used for capturing insects. Some species have feet with two toes pointing forward and two backward, while several species have only three toes. Many woodpeckers have the habit of tapping noisily on tree trunks with their beaks.

- Eurasian wryneck, Jynx torquilla
- Speckled piculet, Picumnus innominatus
- White-browed piculet, Sasia ochracea
- Heart-spotted woodpecker, Hemicircus canente (A)
- Brown-capped pygmy woodpecker, Yungipicus nanus (A)
- Gray-capped pygmy woodpecker, Yungipicus canicapillus
- Yellow-crowned woodpecker, Leiopicus mahrattensis
- Fulvous-breasted woodpecker, Dendrocopos macei
- Rufous-bellied woodpecker, Dendrocopos hyperythrus
- Bay woodpecker, Blythipicus pyrrhotis
- Greater flameback, Chrysocolaptes guttacristatus
- Rufous woodpecker, Micropternus brachyurus
- Pale-headed woodpecker, Gecinulus grantia
- Himalayan flameback, Dinopium shorii
- Common flameback, Dinopium javanense
- Black-rumped flameback, Dinopium benghalense
- Lesser yellownape, Picus chlorolophus
- Streak-throated woodpecker, Picus xanthopygaeus
- Streak-breasted woodpecker, Picus viridanus
- Laced woodpecker, Picus vittatus
- Gray-headed woodpecker, Picus canus
- Greater yellownape, Chrysophlegma flavinucha
- Great slaty woodpecker, Mulleripicus pulverulentus

== Falcons and caracaras ==
Order: Falconiformes Family: Falconidae

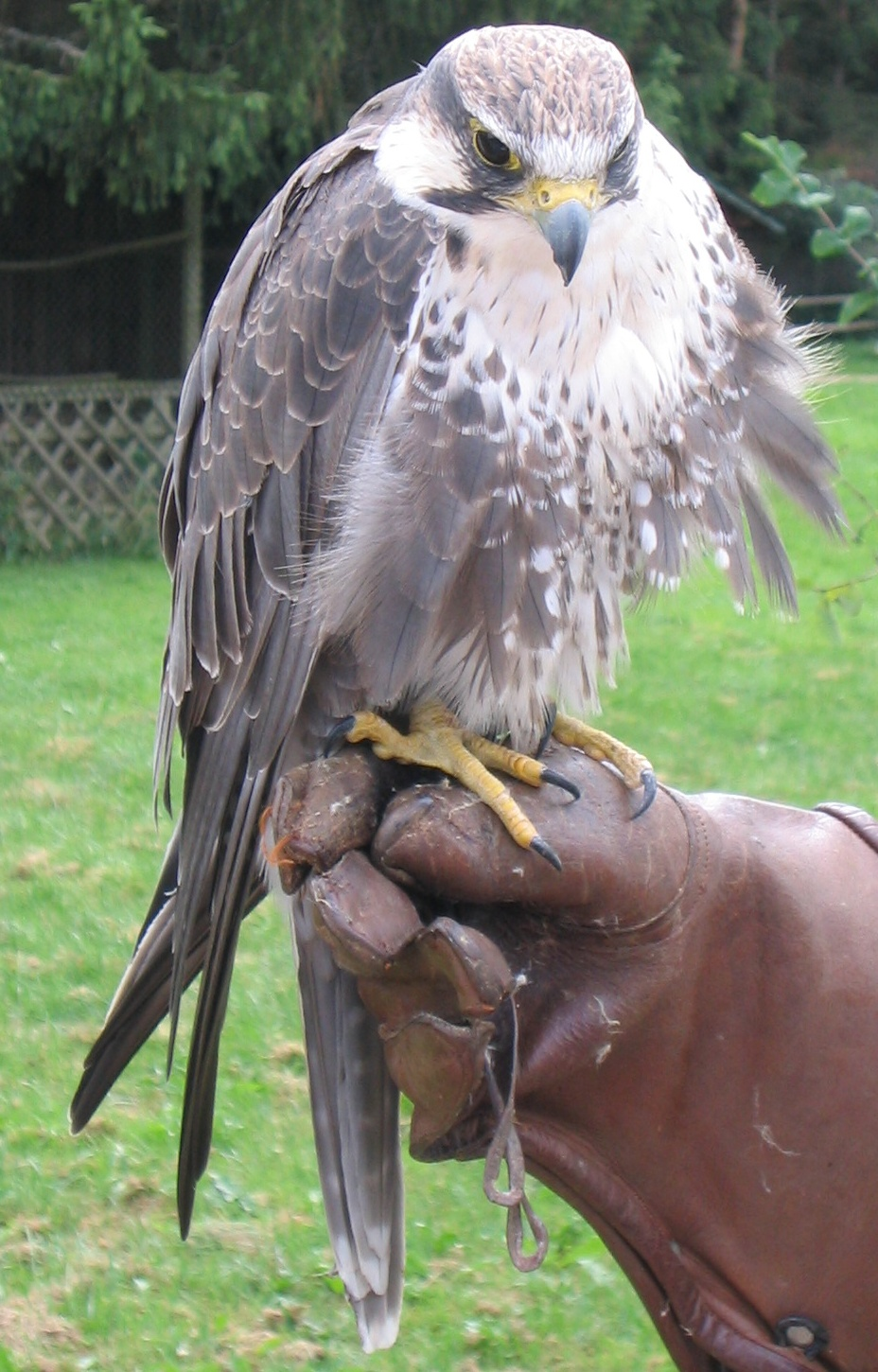
Laggar falcon, Falco jugger

Falconidae is a family of diurnal birds of prey. They differ from hawks, eagles and kites in that they kill with their beaks instead of their talons.

- Collared falconet, Microhierax caerulescens
- Pied falconet, Microhierax melanoleucus
- Lesser kestrel, Falco naumanni (A)
- Eurasian kestrel, Falco tinnunculus
- Red-necked falcon, Falco chicquera
- Amur falcon, Falco amurensis
- Merlin, Falco columbarius (A)
- Eurasian hobby, Falco subbuteo
- Oriental hobby, Falco severus (A) (Ex)
- Laggar falcon, Falco jugger
- Saker falcon, Falco cherrug
- Peregrine falcon, Falco peregrinus

== Old World parrots ==
Order: Psittaciformes Family: Psittaculidae

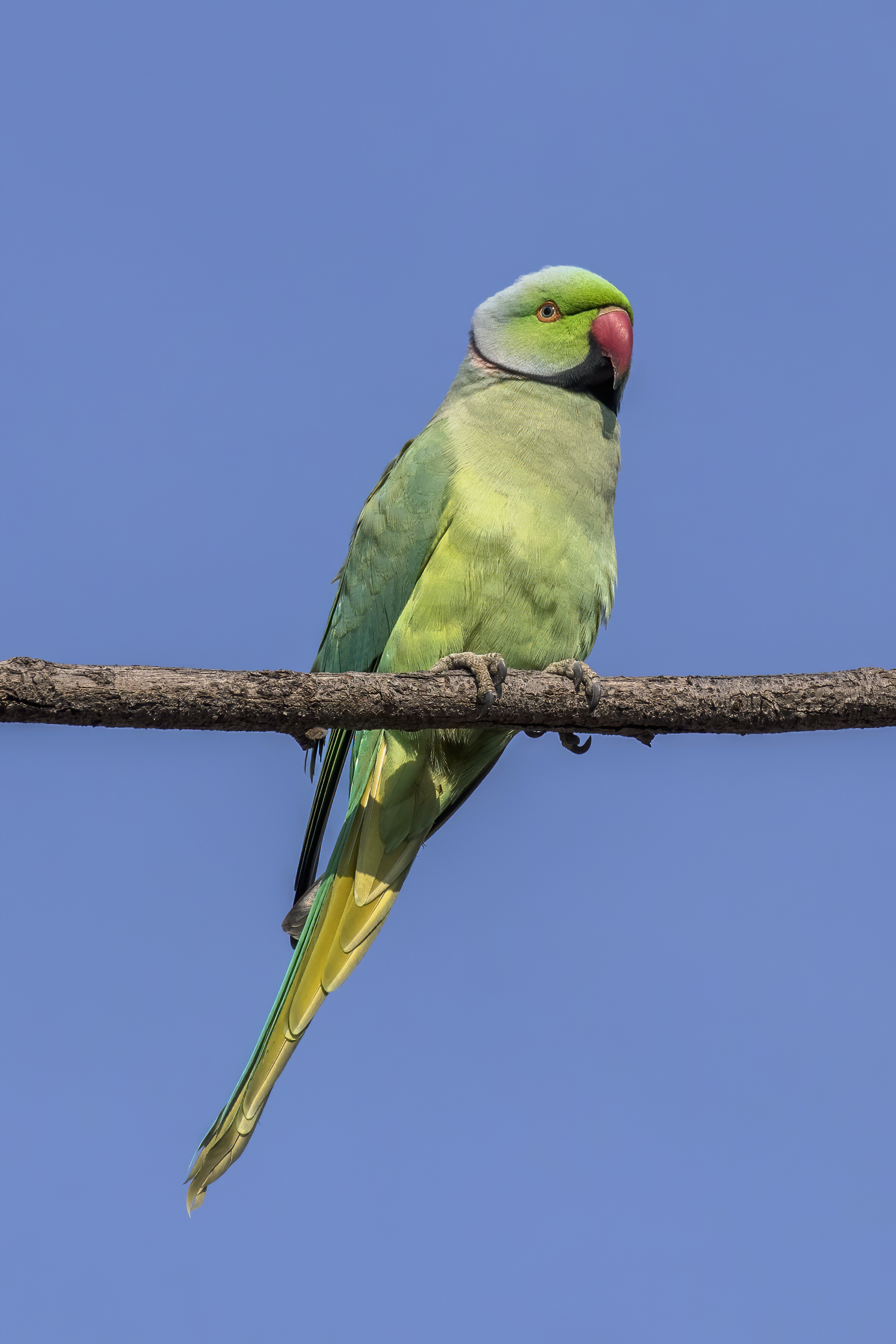
Rose ringed parakeet male in jaipur

Characteristic features of parrots include a strong curved bill, an upright stance, strong legs, and clawed zygodactyl feet. Many parrots are vividly coloured, and some are multi-coloured. In size they range from 8 cm (3.1 in) to 1 m (3.3 ft) in length. Old World parrots are found from Africa east across south and southeast Asia and Oceania to Australia and New Zealand.

- Alexandrine parakeet, Psittacula eupatria
- Rose-ringed parakeet, Psittacula krameri (I)
- Gray-headed parakeet, Psittacula finschii
- Plum-headed parakeet, Psittacula cyanocephala
- Blossom-headed parakeet, Psittacula roseata
- Red-breasted parakeet, Psittacula alexandri
- Vernal hanging-parrot, Loriculus vernalis

== Asian and Grauer's broadbills ==
Order: Passeriformes Family: Eurylaimidae

The broadbills are small, brightly coloured birds, which feed on fruit and also take insects in flycatcher fashion, snapping their broad bills. Their habitat is canopies of wet forests.

- Long-tailed broadbill, Psarisomus dalhousiae
- Silver-breasted broadbill, Serilophus lunatus

== Pittas ==
Order: Passeriformes Family: Pittidae

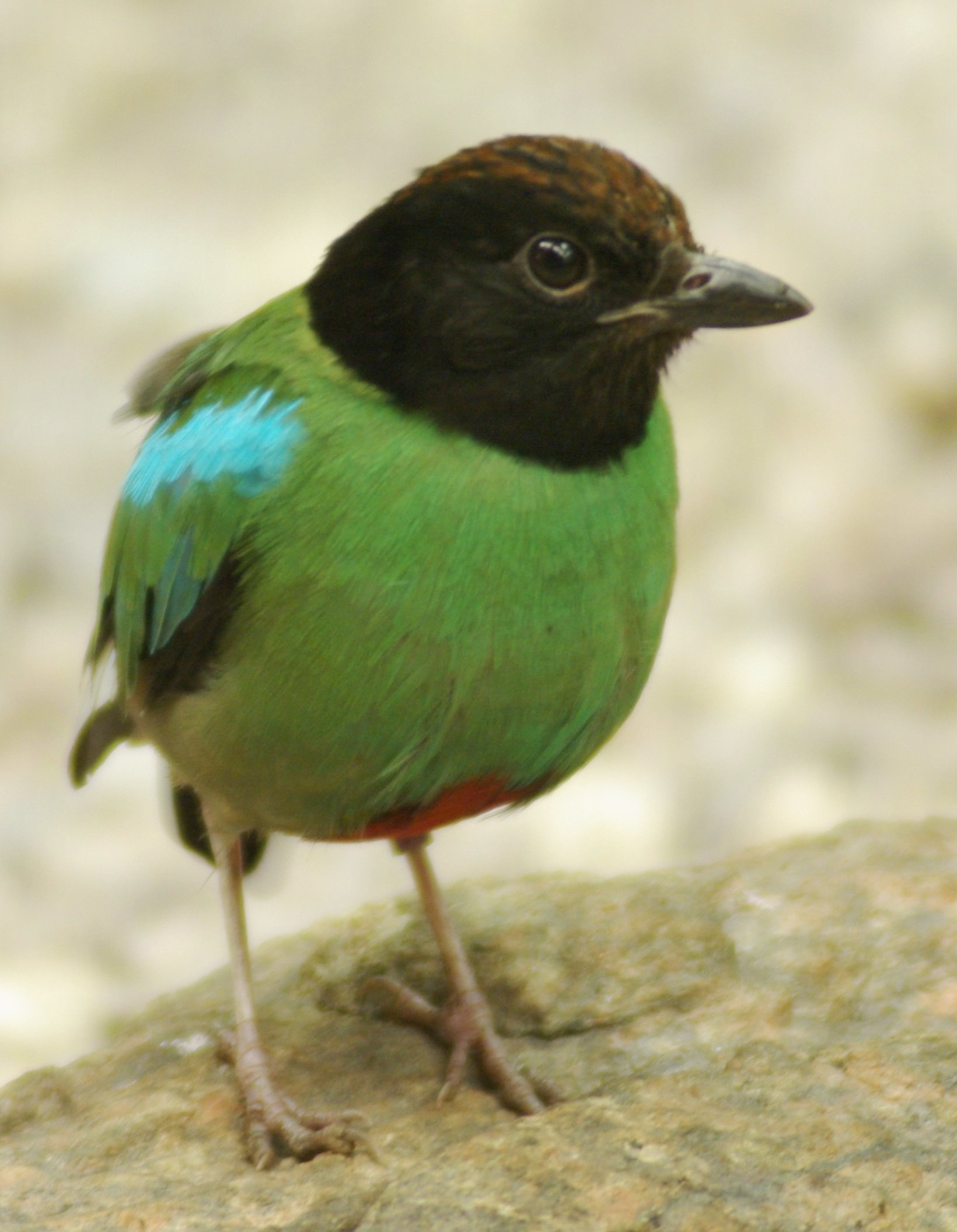
Hooded pitta, Pitta sordida

Pittas are medium-sized by passerine standards and are stocky, with fairly long, strong legs, short tails and stout bills. Many are brightly coloured. They spend the majority of their time on wet forest floors, eating snails, insects and similar invertebrates.

- Blue-naped pitta, Hydrornis nipalensis
- Blue pitta, Hydrornis cyanea
- Indian pitta, Pitta brachyura
- Hooded pitta, Pitta sordida
- Mangrove pitta, Pitta megarhyncha

== Cuckooshrikes ==
Order: Passeriformes Family: Campephagidae

The cuckooshrikes are small to medium-sized passerine birds. They are predominantly greyish with white and black, although some species are brightly coloured.

- White-bellied minivet, Pericrocotus erythropygius
- Small minivet, Pericrocotus cinnamomeus
- Gray-chinned minivet, Pericrocotus solaris
- Short-billed minivet, Pericrocotus brevirostris
- Long-tailed minivet, Pericrocotus ethologus
- Scarlet minivet, Pericrocotus flammeus
- Ashy minivet, Pericrocotus divaricatus (A)
- Brown-rumped minivet, Pericrocotus cantonensis
- Rosy minivet, Pericrocotus roseus
- Large cuckooshrike, Coracina macei
- Black-winged cuckooshrike, Lalage melaschistos
- Black-headed cuckooshrike, Lalage melanoptera

== Vireos, shrike-babblers, and erpornis ==
Order: Passeriformes Family: Vireonidae

Most of the members of this family are found in the New World. However, the shrike-babblers and erpornis, which only slightly resemble the "true" vireos and greenlets, are found in South East Asia.

- Black-eared shrike-babbler, Pteruthius melanotis
- White-bellied erpornis, Erpornis zantholeuca

== Whistlers and allies ==
Order: Passeriformes Family: Pachycephalidae

The family Pachycephalidae includes the whistlers, shrikethrushes, and some of the pitohuis.

- Mangrove whistler, Pachycephala cinerea

== Old World orioles ==
Order: Passeriformes Family: Oriolidae

The Old World orioles are colourful passerine birds. They are not related to the New World orioles.

- Indian golden oriole, Oriolus kundoo
- Black-naped oriole, Oriolus chinensis
- Slender-billed oriole, Oriolus tenuirostris (A)
- Black-hooded oriole, Oriolus xanthornus
- Maroon oriole, Oriolus traillii

== Woodswallows, bellmagpies, and allies ==
Order: Passeriformes Family: Artamidae

The woodswallows are soft-plumaged, somber-coloured passerine birds. They are smooth, agile flyers with moderately large, semi-triangular wings.

- Ashy woodswallow, Artamus fuscus

== Vangas, helmetshrikes, and allies ==
Order: Passeriformes Family: Vangidae

The family Vangidae is highly variable, though most members of it resemble true shrikes to some degree.

- Large woodshrike, Tephrodornis gularis
- Common woodshrike, Tephrodornis pondicerianus
- Bar-winged flycatcher-shrike, Hemipus picatus

== Ioras ==
Order: Passeriformes Family: Aegithinidae

The ioras are bulbul-like birds of open forest or thorn scrub, but whereas that group tends to be drab in colouration, ioras are sexually dimorphic, with the males being brightly plumaged in yellows and greens.

- Common iora, Aegithina tiphia
- White-tailed iora, Aegithina nigrolutea

== Fantails ==
Order: Passeriformes Family: Rhipiduridae

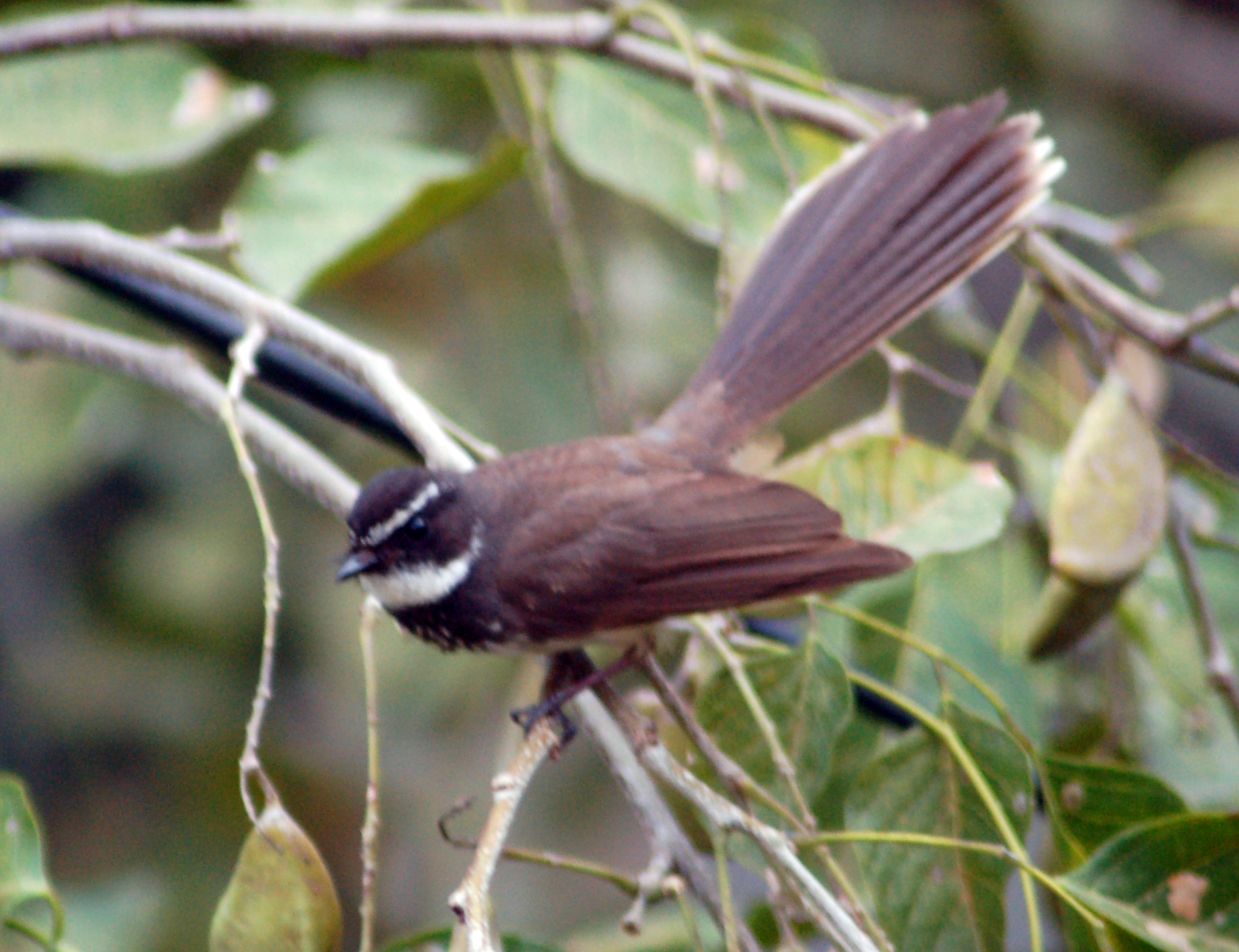
White-throated fantail, Rhipidura albicollis

The fantails are small insectivorous birds which are specialist aerial feeders.

- White-throated fantail, Rhipidura albicollis
- White-browed fantail, Rhipidura aureola

== Drongos ==
Order: Passeriformes Family: Dicruridae

The drongos are mostly black or dark grey in colour, sometimes with metallic tints. They have long forked tails, and some Asian species have elaborate tail decorations. They have short legs and sit very upright when perched, like a shrike. They flycatch or take prey from the ground.

- Black drongo, Dicrurus macrocercus
- Ashy drongo, Dicrurus leucophaeus
- White-bellied drongo, Dicrurus caerulescens
- Crow-billed drongo, Dicrurus annectens
- Bronzed drongo, Dicrurus aeneus
- Lesser racket-tailed drongo, Dicrurus remifer
- Hair-crested drongo, Dicrurus hottentottus
- Greater racket-tailed drongo, Dicrurus paradiseus

== Monarch flycatchers ==
Order: Passeriformes Family: Monarchidae

The monarch flycatchers are small to medium-sized insectivorous passerines which hunt by flycatching.

- Black-naped monarch, Hypothymis azurea
- Amur paradise-flycatcher, Terpsiphone incei (A)
- Blyth's paradise-flycatcher, Terpsiphone affinis
- Indian paradise-flycatcher, Terpsiphone paradisi

== Shrikes ==
Order: Passeriformes Family: Laniidae

Shrikes are passerine birds known for their habit of catching other birds and small animals and impaling the uneaten portions of their bodies on thorns. A typical shrike's beak is hooked, like a bird of prey.

- Isabelline shrike, Lanius isabellinus (A)
- Brown shrike, Lanius cristatus
- Burmese shrike, Lanius collurioides (A)
- Bay-backed shrike, Lanius vittatus
- Long-tailed shrike, Lanius schach
- Gray-backed shrike, Lanius tephronotus
- Great gray shrike, Lanius excubitor

== Crows, jays, and magpies ==
Order: Passeriformes Family: Corvidae

The family Corvidae includes crows, ravens, jays, choughs, magpies, treepies, nutcrackers and ground jays. Corvids are above average in size among the Passeriformes, and some of the larger species show high levels of intelligence.

- Eurasian jay, Garrulus glandarius
- Red-billed blue-magpie, Urocissa erythrorhyncha
- Common green-magpie, Cissa chinensis
- Rufous treepie, Dendrocitta vagabunda
- Gray treepie, Dendrocitta formosae
- Collared treepie, Dendrocitta frontalis
- House crow, Corvus splendens
- Large-billed crow, Corvus macrorhynchos

== Fairy flycatchers ==
Order: Passeriformes Family: Stenostiridae

Most of the species of this small family are found in Africa, though a few inhabit tropical Asia. They are not closely related to other birds called "flycatchers".

- Yellow-bellied fairy-fantail, Chelidorhynx hypoxanthus
- Gray-headed canary-flycatcher, Culicicapa ceylonensis

== Tits, chickadees, and titmice ==
Order: Passeriformes Family: Paridae

The Paridae are mainly small stocky woodland species with short stout bills. Some have crests. They are adaptable birds, with a mixed diet including seeds and insects.

- Sultan tit, Melanochlora sultanea
- Green-backed tit, Parus monticolus (A)
- Cinereous tit, Parus cinereus
- Yellow-cheeked tit, Parus spilonotus

== Larks ==
Order: Passeriformes Family: Alaudidae

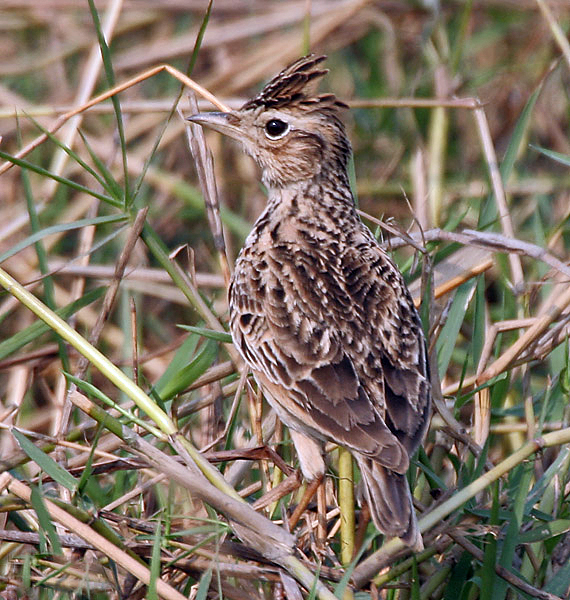
Oriental skylark, Alauda gulgula

Larks are small terrestrial birds with often extravagant songs and display flights. Most larks are fairly dull in appearance. Their food is insects and seeds.

- Ashy-crowned sparrow-lark, Eremopterix griseus
- Horsfield's bushlark, Mirafra javanica
- Bengal bushlark, Mirafra assamica
- Greater short-toed lark, Calandrella brachydactyla (A)
- Mongolian short-toed lark, Calandrella dukhunensis
- Hume's lark, Calandrella acutirostris
- Sand lark, Alaudala raytal
- Oriental skylark, Alauda gulgula

== Cisticolas and allies ==
Order: Passeriformes Family: Cisticolidae

The Cisticolidae are warblers found mainly in warmer southern regions of the Old World. They are generally very small birds of drab brown or grey appearance found in open country such as grassland or scrub.

- Common tailorbird, Orthotomus sutorius
- Dark-necked tailorbird, Orthotomus atrogularis
- Himalayan prinia, Prinia crinigera
- Black-throated prinia, Prinia atrogularis
- Rufous-fronted prinia, Prinia buchanani (A)
- Rufescent prinia, Prinia rufescens
- Gray-breasted prinia, Prinia hodgsonii
- Delicate prinia, Prinia lepida
- Jungle prinia, Prinia sylvatica
- Yellow-bellied prinia, Prinia flaviventris
- Ashy prinia, Prinia socialis
- Plain prinia, Prinia inornata
- Zitting cisticola, Cisticola juncidis
- Golden-headed cisticola, Cisticola exilis

== Reed warblers and allies ==
Order: Passeriformes Family: Acrocephalidae

The members of this family are usually rather large for "warblers". Most are rather plain olivaceous brown above with much yellow to beige below. They are usually found in open woodland, reedbeds, or tall grass. The family occurs mostly in southern to western Eurasia and surroundings, but it also ranges far into the Pacific, with some species in Africa.

- Thick-billed warbler, Arundinax aedon
- Booted warbler, Iduna caligata
- Sykes's warbler, Iduna rama (A)
- Black-browed reed warbler, Acrocephalus bistrigiceps
- Paddyfield warbler, Acrocephalus agricola
- Blunt-winged warbler, Acrocephalus concinens
- Blyth's reed warbler, Acrocephalus dumetorum
- Large-billed reed warbler, Acrocephalus orinus (A)
- Oriental reed warbler, Acrocephalus orientalis
- Clamorous reed warbler, Acrocephalus stentoreus

== Grassbirds and allies ==
Order: Passeriformes Family: Locustellidae

Locustellidae are a family of small insectivorous songbirds found mainly in Eurasia, Africa, and the Australian region. They are smallish birds with tails that are usually long and pointed, and tend to be drab brownish or buffy all over.

- Striated grassbird, Megalurus palustris
- Pallas's grasshopper warbler, Helopsaltes certhiola
- Lanceolated warbler, Locustella lanceolata (A)
- Brown bush warbler, Locustella luteoventris (A)
- Common grasshopper-warbler, Locustella naevia (A)
- Baikal bush warbler, Locustella davidi (A)
- West Himalayan bush warbler, Locustella kashmirensis (A)
- Spotted bush warbler, Locustella thoracica (A)
- Russet bush warbler, Locustella mandelli
- Bristled grassbird, Schoenicola striatus

== Cupwings ==
Order: Passeriformes Family: Pnoepygidae

The members of this small family are found in mountainous parts of South and South East Asia.

- Pygmy cupwing, Pnoepyga pusilla (A)

== Swallows ==
Order: Passeriformes Family: Hirundinidae

The family Hirundinidae is adapted to aerial feeding. They have a slender streamlined body, long pointed wings and a short bill with a wide gape. The feet are adapted to perching rather than walking, and the front toes are partially joined at the base.

- Gray-throated martin, Riparia chinensis
- Bank swallow, Riparia riparia
- Pale sand martin, Riparia diluta (A)
- Dusky crag-martin, Ptyonoprogne concolor
- Barn swallow, Hirundo rustica
- Wire-tailed swallow, Hirundo smithii
- Red-rumped swallow, Cecropis daurica
- Striated swallow, Cecropis striolata
- Streak-throated swallow, Petrochelidon fluvicola (A)
- Common house-martin, Delichon urbicum
- Asian house-martin, Delichon dasypus (A)
- Nepal house-martin, Delichon nipalense

== Bulbuls ==
Order: Passeriformes Family: Pycnonotidae

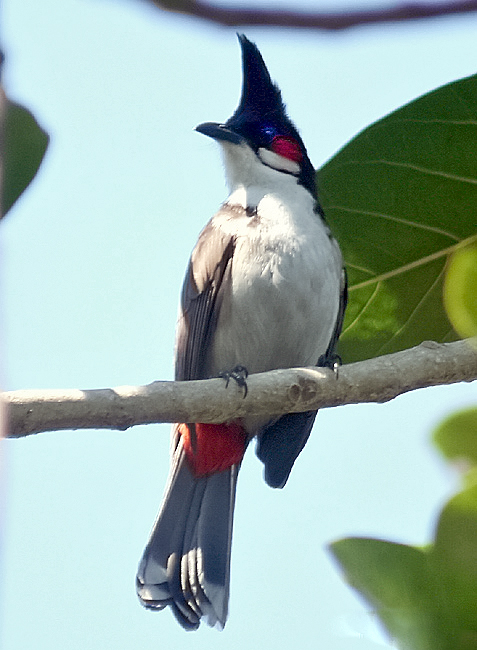
Red-whiskered bulbul, Pycnonotus jocosus

Bulbuls are medium-sized songbirds. Some are colourful with yellow, red or orange vents, cheeks, throats or supercilia, but most are drab, with uniform olive-brown to black plumage. Some species have distinct crests.

- Black-headed bulbul, Brachypodius melanocephalos
- Black-crested bulbul, Rubigula flaviventris
- Crested finchbill, Spizixos canifrons
- Red-vented bulbul, Pycnonotus cafer
- Red-whiskered bulbul, Pycnonotus jocosus
- Flavescent bulbul, Pycnonotus flavescens
- White-browed bulbul, Pycnonotus luteolus
- White-throated bulbul, Alophoixus flaveolus
- Cachar bulbul, Iole cacharensis
- Black bulbul, Hypsipetes leucocephalus
- Ashy bulbul, Hemixos flavala
- Mountain bulbul, Ixos mcclellandii

== Leaf warblers ==
Order: Passeriformes Family: Phylloscopidae

Leaf warblers are a family of small insectivorous birds found mostly in Eurasia and ranging into Wallacea and Africa. The species are of various sizes, often green-plumaged above and yellow below, or more subdued with greyish-green to greyish-brown colours.

- Yellow-browed warbler, Phylloscopus inornatus
- Hume's warbler, Phylloscopus humei (A)
- Pallas's leaf warbler, Phylloscopus proregulus
- Lemon-rumped warbler, Phylloscopus chloronotus
- Radde's warbler, Phylloscopus schwarzi
- Sulphur-bellied warbler, Phylloscopus griseolus
- Tickell's leaf warbler, Phylloscopus affinis
- Dusky warbler, Phylloscopus fuscatus
- Smoky warbler, Phylloscopus fuligiventer (A)
- Common chiffchaff, Phylloscopus collybita
- Eastern crowned warbler, Phylloscopus coronatus
- White-spectacled warbler, Phylloscopus intermedius (A)
- Gray-cheeked warbler, Phylloscopus poliogenys
- Green-crowned warbler, Phylloscopus burkii
- Gray-crowned warbler, Phylloscopus tephrocephalus
- Whistler's warbler, Phylloscopus whistleri
- Green warbler, Phylloscopus nitidus
- Greenish warbler, Phylloscopus trochiloides
- Large-billed leaf warbler, Phylloscopus magnirostris (A)
- Pale-legged leaf warbler, Phylloscopus tenellipes (A)
- Sakhalin leaf warbler, Phylloscopus borealoides (A)
- Chestnut-crowned warbler, Phylloscopus castaniceps (A)
- Yellow-vented warbler, Phylloscopus cantator
- Western crowned warbler, Phylloscopus occipitalis
- Blyth's leaf warbler, Phylloscopus reguloides
- Claudia's leaf warbler, Phylloscopus claudiae
- Gray-hooded warbler, Phylloscopus xanthoschistos

== Bush warblers and allies ==
Order: Passeriformes Family: Scotocercidae

The members of this family are found throughout Africa, Asia, and Polynesia. Their taxonomy is in flux, and some authorities place some genera in other families.

- Asian stubtail, Urosphena squameiceps (A)
- Gray-bellied tesia, Tesia cyaniventer
- Slaty-bellied tesia, Tesia olivea (A)
- Chestnut-crowned bush warbler, Cettia major (A)
- Gray-sided bush warbler, Cettia brunnifrons (A)
- Chestnut-headed tesia, Cettia castaneocoronata (A)
- Yellow-bellied warbler, Abroscopus superciliaris
- Rufous-faced warbler, Abroscopus albogularis
- Mountain tailorbird, Phyllergates cucullatus
- Brownish-flanked bush warbler, Horornis fortipes
- Aberrant bush warbler, Horornis flavolivaceus (A)

== Sylviid warblers, parrotbills, and allies ==
Order: Passeriformes Family: Sylviidae

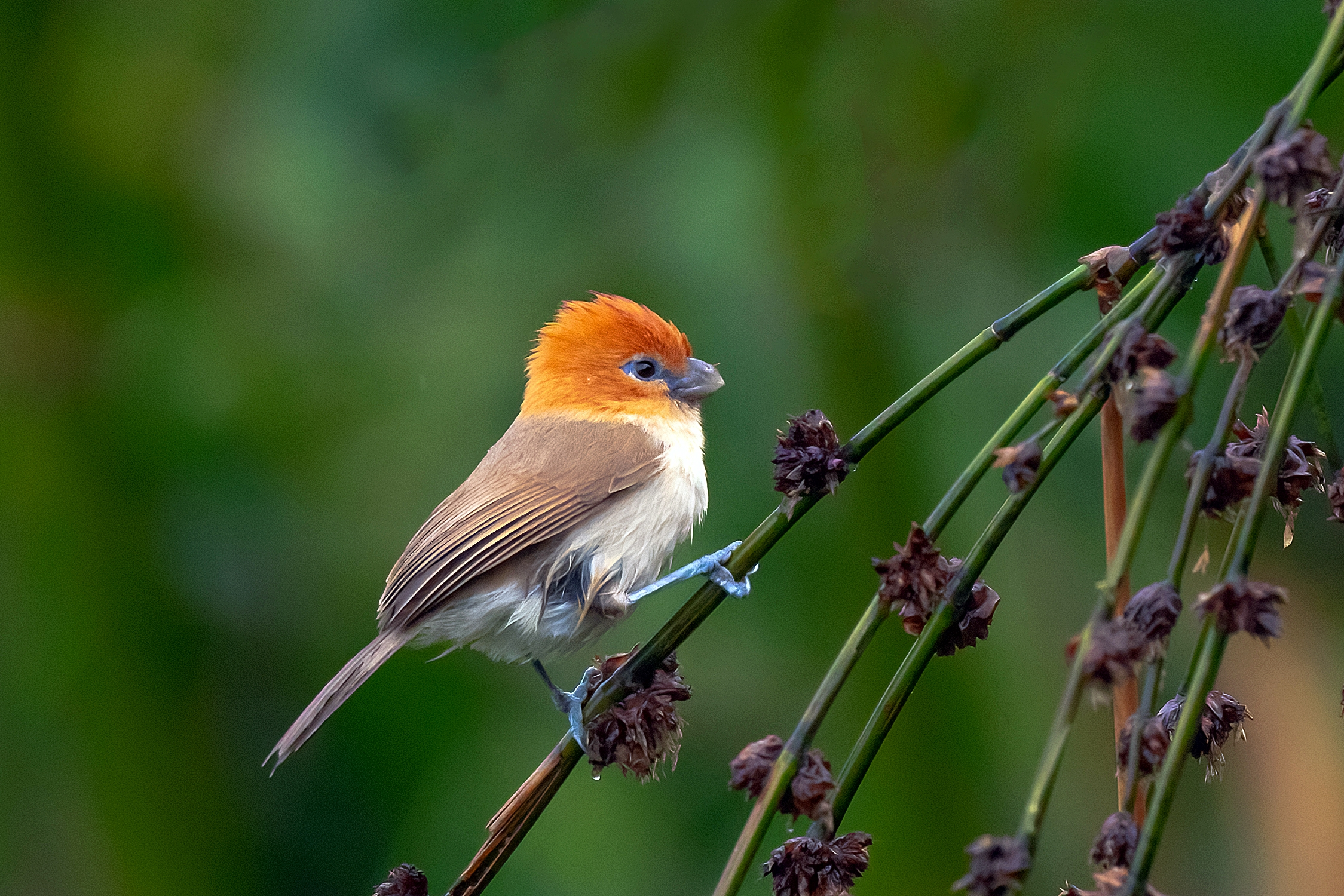
Rufous-headed parrotbill, Psittiparus bakeri

The family Sylviidae is a group of small insectivorous passerine birds. They mainly occur as breeding species, as the common name implies, in Europe, Asia and, to a lesser extent, Africa. Most are of generally undistinguished appearance, but many have distinctive songs.

- Lesser whitethroat, Curruca curruca (A)
- Eastern Orphean warbler, Curruca crassirostris
- Yellow-eyed babbler, Chrysomma sinense
- Jerdon's babbler, Chrysomma altirostre
- Gray-headed parrotbill, Psittiparus gularis
- Rufous-headed parrotbill, Psittiparus bakeri
- Black-breasted parrotbill, Paradoxornis flavirostris
- Spot-breasted parrotbill, Paradoxornis guttaticollis
- Pale-billed parrotbill, Chleuasicus atrosuperciliaris

== White-eyes, yuhinas, and allies ==
Order: Passeriformes Family: Zosteropidae

The white-eyes are small birds of rather drab appearance, the plumage above being typically greenish-olive, but some species have a white or bright yellow throat, breast, or lower parts, and several have buff flanks. As the name suggests, many species have a white ring around each eye.

- Striated yuhina, Staphida castaniceps
- White-naped yuhina, Yuhina bakeri
- Whiskered yuhina, Yuhina flavicollis
- Stripe-throated yuhina, Yuhina gularis
- Black-chinned yuhina, Yuhina nigrimenta
- Indian white-eye, Zosterops palpebrosus

== Tree-babblers, scimitar-babblers, and allies ==
Order: Passeriformes Family: Timaliidae

The babblers, or timaliids, are somewhat diverse in size and colouration, but are characterised by soft fluffy plumage.

- Chestnut-capped babbler, Timalia pileata
- Pin-striped tit-babbler, Mixornis gularis
- Tawny-bellied babbler, Dumetia hyperythra
- Golden babbler, Cyanoderma chrysaeum (Bangla: dhupe)
- Buff-chested babbler, Cyanoderma ambiguum
- Red-billed scimitar-babbler, Pomatorhinus ochraceiceps
- Slender-billed scimitar-babbler, Pomatorhinus superciliaris
- Streak-breasted scimitar-babbler, Pomatorhinus ruficollis
- White-browed scimitar-babbler, Pomatorhinus schisticeps
- Large scimitar-babbler, Erythrogenys hypoleucos
- Rusty-cheeked scimitar-babbler, Erythrogenys erythrogenys
- Gray-throated babbler, Stachyris nigriceps

== Ground babblers and allies ==
Order: Passeriformes Family: Pellorneidae

These small to medium-sized songbirds have soft fluffy plumage but are otherwise rather diverse. Members of the genus Illadopsis are found in forests, but some other genera are birds of scrublands.

- White-hooded babbler, Gampsorhynchus rufulus
- Yellow-throated fulvetta, Schoeniparus cinereus
- Rufous-winged fulvetta, Schoeniparus castaneceps
- Rufous-throated fulvetta, Schoeniparus rufogularis
- Rufous-vented grass babbler, Laticilla burnesii
- Swamp grass babbler, Laticilla cinerascens
- Puff-throated babbler, Pellorneum ruficeps
- Marsh babbler, Pellorneum palustre
- Spot-throated babbler, Pellorneum albiventre
- Buff-breasted babbler, Pellorneum tickelli
- Long-billed wren-babbler, Napothera malacoptila
- Abbott's babbler, Malacocincla abbotti
- Streaked wren-babbler, Turdinus brevicaudatus (A)
- Indian grassbird, Graminicola bengalensis

== Laughingthrushes and allies ==
Order: Passeriformes Family: Leiothrichidae

The members of this family are diverse in size and colouration, though those of genus Turdoides tend to be brown or greyish. The family is found in Africa, India, and southeast Asia.

- Brown-cheeked fulvetta, Alcippe poioicephala
- Nepal fulvetta, Alcippe nipalensis
- Common babbler, Argya caudata
- Striated babbler, Argya earlei
- Slender-billed babbler, Argya longirostris
- Jungle babbler, Argya striata
- White-crested laughingthrush, Garrulax leucolophus
- Lesser necklaced laughingthrush, Garrulax monileger
- Rufous-chinned laughingthrush, Ianthocincla rufogularis
- Greater necklaced laughingthrush, Pterorhinus pectoralis
- Rufous-necked laughingthrush, Pterorhinus ruficollis
- Yellow-throated laughingthrush, Pterorhinus galbanus
- Rufous-vented laughingthrush, Pterorhinus gularis
- Long-tailed sibia, Heterophasia picaoides (A)
- Red-tailed minla, Minla ignotincta
- Red-faced liocichla, Liocichla phoenicea
- Rusty-fronted barwing, Actinodura egertoni
- Blue-winged minla, Actinodura cyanouroptera

== Nuthatches ==
Order: Passeriformes Family: Sittidae

Nuthatches are small woodland birds. They have the unusual ability to climb down trees head first, unlike other birds which can only go upwards. Nuthatches have big heads, short tails and powerful bills and feet.

- Indian nuthatch, Sitta castanea
- Chestnut-bellied nuthatch, Sitta cinnamoventris
- Chestnut-vented nuthatch, Sitta nagaensis
- Velvet-fronted nuthatch, Sitta frontalis

== Treecreepers ==
Order: Passeriformes Family: Certhiidae

Treecreepers are small woodland birds, brown above and white below. They have thin pointed down-curved bills, which they use to extricate insects from bark. They have stiff tail feathers, like woodpeckers, which they use to support themselves on vertical trees.

- Bar-tailed treecreeper, Certhia himalayana

== Wrens ==
Order: Passeriformes Family: Troglodytidae

The wrens are mainly small and inconspicuous except for their loud songs. These birds have short wings and thin down-turned bills. Several species often hold their tails upright. All are insectivorous.

- Eurasian wren, Troglodytes troglodytes

== Spotted elachura ==
Order: Passeriformes Family: Elachuridae

This species, the only one in its family, inhabits forest undergrowth throughout South East Asia.

- Spotted elachura, Elachura formosa

== Dippers ==
Order: Passeriformes Family: Cinclidae

Dippers are a group of perching birds whose habitat includes aquatic environments in the Americas, Europe and Asia. They are named for their bobbing or dipping movements.

- Brown dipper, Cinclus pallasii

== Starlings ==
Order: Passeriformes Family: Sturnidae

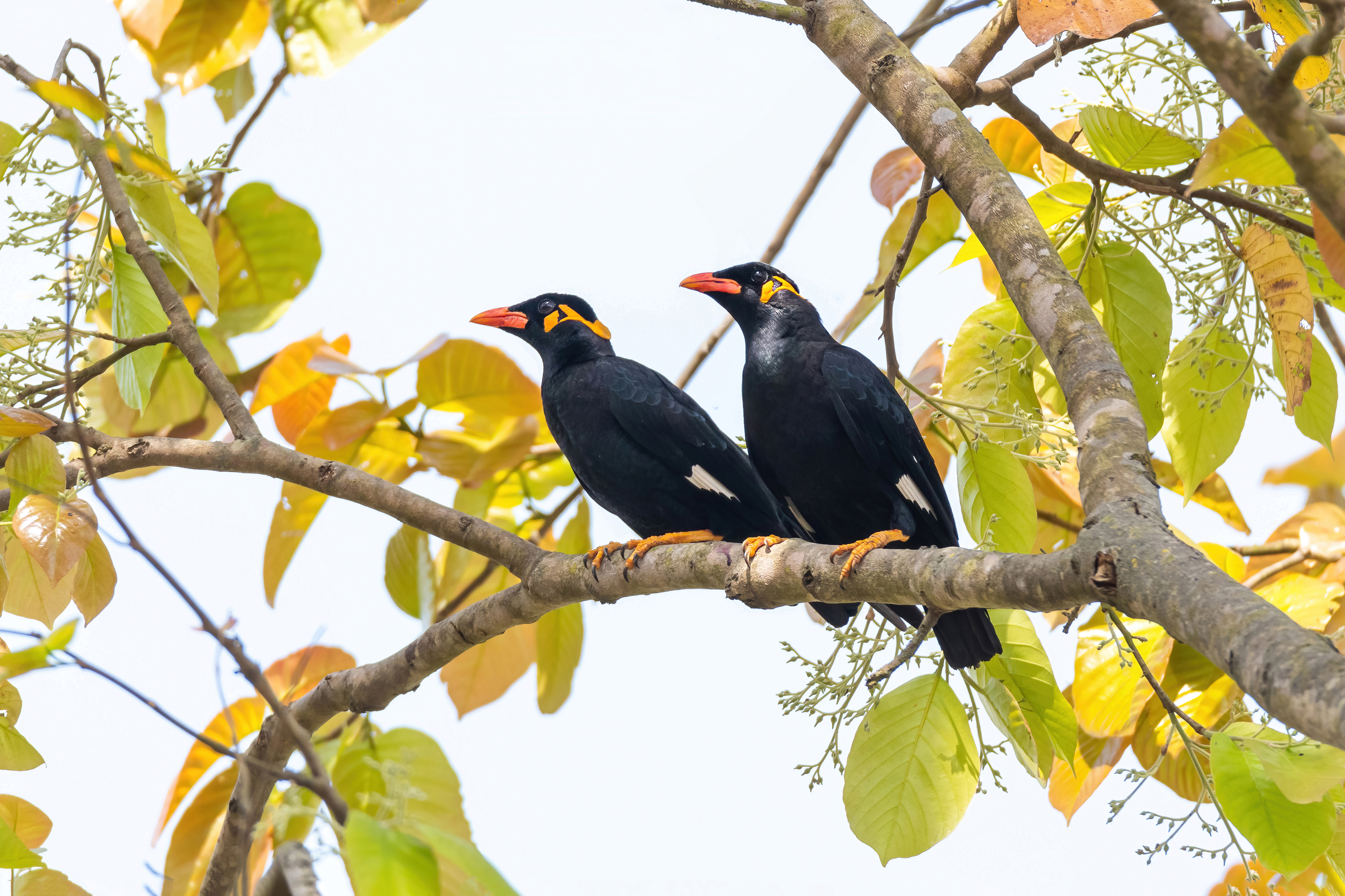
Common hill myna, Gracula religiosa

Starlings are small to medium-sized passerine birds. Their flight is strong and direct and they are very gregarious. Their preferred habitat is fairly open country. They eat insects and fruit. Plumage is typically dark with a metallic sheen.

- Asian glossy starling, Aplonis panayensis
- Golden-crested myna, Ampeliceps coronatus (A)
- Common hill myna, Gracula religiosa
- European starling, Sturnus vulgaris (A)
- Rosy starling, Pastor roseus (A)
- Daurian starling, Agropsar sturninus (A)
- Chestnut-cheeked starling, Agropsar philippensis (A)
- Indian pied starling, Gracupica contra
- Brahminy starling, Sturnia pagodarum
- Chestnut-tailed starling, Sturnia malabarica
- Common myna, Acridotheres tristis
- Bank myna, Acridotheres ginginianus
- Jungle myna, Acridotheres fuscus
- Pale-bellied myna, Acridotheres cinereus (I)
- Great myna, Acridotheres grandis
- Spot-winged starling, Saroglossa spilopterus

== Thrushes and allies ==
Order: Passeriformes Family: Turdidae

The thrushes are a group of passerine birds that occur mainly in the Old World. They are plump, soft plumaged, small to medium-sized insectivores or sometimes omnivores, often feeding on the ground. Many have attractive songs.

- Long-tailed thrush, Zoothera dixoni
- Alpine thrush, Zoothera mollissima (A)
- Dark-sided thrush, Zoothera marginata (A)
- Long-billed thrush, Zoothera monticola (A)
- Scaly thrush, Zoothera dauma (A)
- Purple cochoa, Cochoa purpurea (A)
- Pied thrush, Geokichla wardii (A)
- Orange-headed thrush, Geokichla citrina
- Eurasian blackbird, Turdus merula
- Gray-winged blackbird, Turdus boulboul
- Indian blackbird, Turdus simillimus (A)
- Tickell's thrush, Turdus unicolor (A)
- Black-breasted thrush, Turdus dissimilis
- Eyebrowed thrush, Turdus obscurus (A)
- White-collared blackbird, Turdus albocinctus
- Black-throated thrush, Turdus atrogularis (A)
- Red-throated thrush, Turdus ruficollis (A)
- Dusky thrush, Turdus eunomus

== Old World flycatchers ==
Order: Passeriformes Family: Muscicapidae

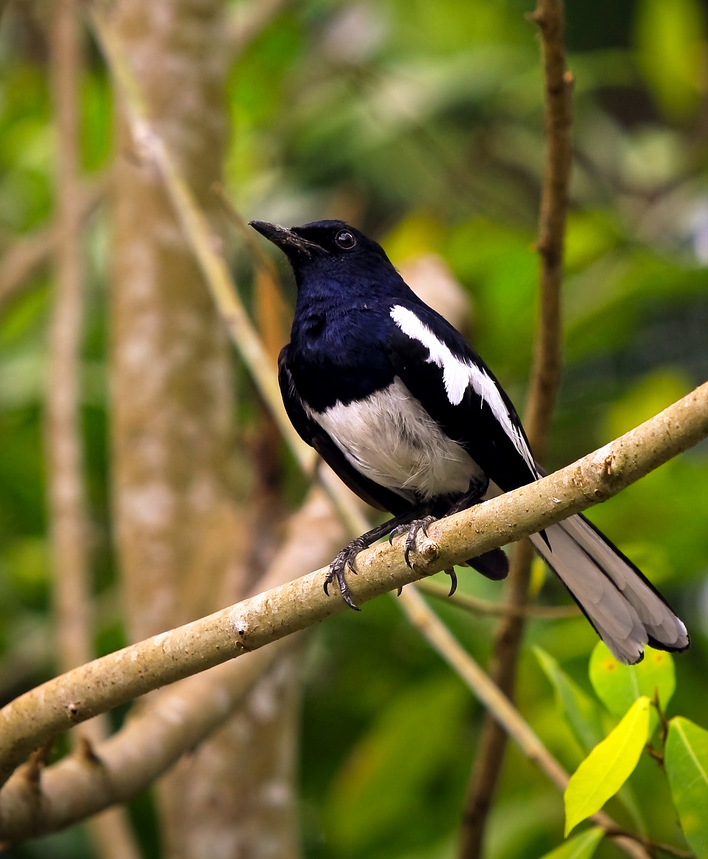
Oriental magpie-robin, Copsychus saularis (Bangla: doel), the national bird of Bangladesh

Old World flycatchers are a large group of small passerine birds native to the Old World. They are mainly small arboreal insectivores. The appearance of these birds is highly varied, but they mostly have weak songs and harsh calls.

- Dark-sided flycatcher, Muscicapa sibirica (A)
- Ferruginous flycatcher, Muscicapa ferruginea (A)
- Asian brown flycatcher, Muscicapa dauurica
- Brown-breasted flycatcher, Muscicapa muttui (A)
- Spotted flycatcher, Muscicapa striata (A)
- Indian robin, Copsychus fulicatus
- Oriental magpie-robin, Copsychus saularis also known as the doel, the national bird of Bangladesh
- White-rumped shama, Copsychus malabaricus
- White-gorgeted flycatcher, Anthipes monileger
- Pale-chinned blue flycatcher, Cyornis poliogenys
- Pale blue flycatcher, Cyornis unicolor (A)
- Blue-throated flycatcher, Cyornis rubeculoides
- Large blue flycatcher, Cyornis magnirostris
- Hill blue flycatcher, Cyornis whitei (A)
- Tickell's blue flycatcher, Cyornis tickelliae
- Large niltava, Niltava grandis (A)
- Small niltava, Niltava macgrigoriae (A)
- Rufous-bellied niltava, Niltava sundara (A)
- Vivid niltava, Niltava vivida
- Verditer flycatcher, Eumyias thalassinus
- Lesser shortwing, Brachypteryx leucophrys (A)
- Himalayan shortwing, Brachypteryx cruralis
- Indian blue robin, Larvivora brunnea (A)
- Siberian blue robin, Larvivora cyane (A)
- Bluethroat, Luscinia svecica
- Blue whistling-thrush, Myophonus caeruleus
- Little forktail, Enicurus scouleri
- White-crowned forktail, Enicurus leschenaulti (A)
- Spotted forktail, Enicurus maculatus
- Black-backed forktail, Enicurus immaculatus
- Slaty-backed forktail, Enicurus schistaceus (A)
- Firethroat, Calliope pectardens (A)
- Siberian rubythroat, Calliope calliope
- Himalayan rubythroat, Calliope pectoralis
- Chinese rubythroat, Calliope tschebaiewi
- White-tailed robin, Myiomela leucura
- Himalayan bluetail, Tarsiger rufilatus
- Rufous-breasted bush-robin, Tarsiger hyperythrus
- White-browed bush-robin, Tarsiger indicus (A)
- Slaty-backed flycatcher, Ficedula erithacus (A)
- Slaty-blue flycatcher, Ficedula tricolor (A)
- Snowy-browed flycatcher, Ficedula hyperythra
- Pygmy flycatcher, Ficedula hodgsoni (A)
- Rufous-gorgeted flycatcher, Ficedula strophiata (A)
- Sapphire flycatcher, Ficedula sapphira (A)
- Little pied flycatcher, Ficedula westermanni
- Ultramarine flycatcher, Ficedula superciliaris (A)
- Rusty-tailed flycatcher, Ficedula ruficauda (A)
- Taiga flycatcher, Ficedula albicilla
- Red-breasted flycatcher, Ficedula parva (A)
- Blue-fronted redstart, Phoenicurus frontalis
- Plumbeous redstart, Phoenicurus fuliginosus
- White-capped redstart, Phoenicurus leucocephalus (A)
- Black redstart, Phoenicurus ochruros
- Daurian redstart, Phoenicurus auroreus (A)
- Chestnut-bellied rock-thrush, Monticola rufiventris (A)
- Blue-capped rock-thrush, Monticola rufiventris (A)
- Blue rock-thrush, Monticola solitarius
- White-throated bushchat, Saxicola insignis (A)
- Siberian stonechat, Saxicola maurus
- White-tailed stonechat, Saxicola leucurus
- Pied bushchat, Saxicola caprata
- Jerdon's bushchat, Saxicola jerdoni (A)
- Gray bushchat, Oenanthe deserti
- Brown rock chat, Oenanthe fusca

== Flowerpeckers ==
Order: Passeriformes Family: Dicaeidae

The flowerpeckers are very small, stout, often brightly coloured birds, with short tails, short thick curved bills and tubular tongues.

- Thick-billed flowerpecker, Dicaeum agile
- Yellow-vented flowerpecker, Dicaeum chrysorrheum
- Yellow-bellied flowerpecker, Dicaeum melanozanthum (A)
- Orange-bellied flowerpecker, Dicaeum trigonostigma
- Pale-billed flowerpecker, Dicaeum erythrorhynchos
- Plain flowerpecker, Dicaeum minullum
- Fire-breasted flowerpecker, Dicaeum ignipectus (A)
- Scarlet-backed flowerpecker, Dicaeum cruentatum

== Sunbirds and spiderhunters ==
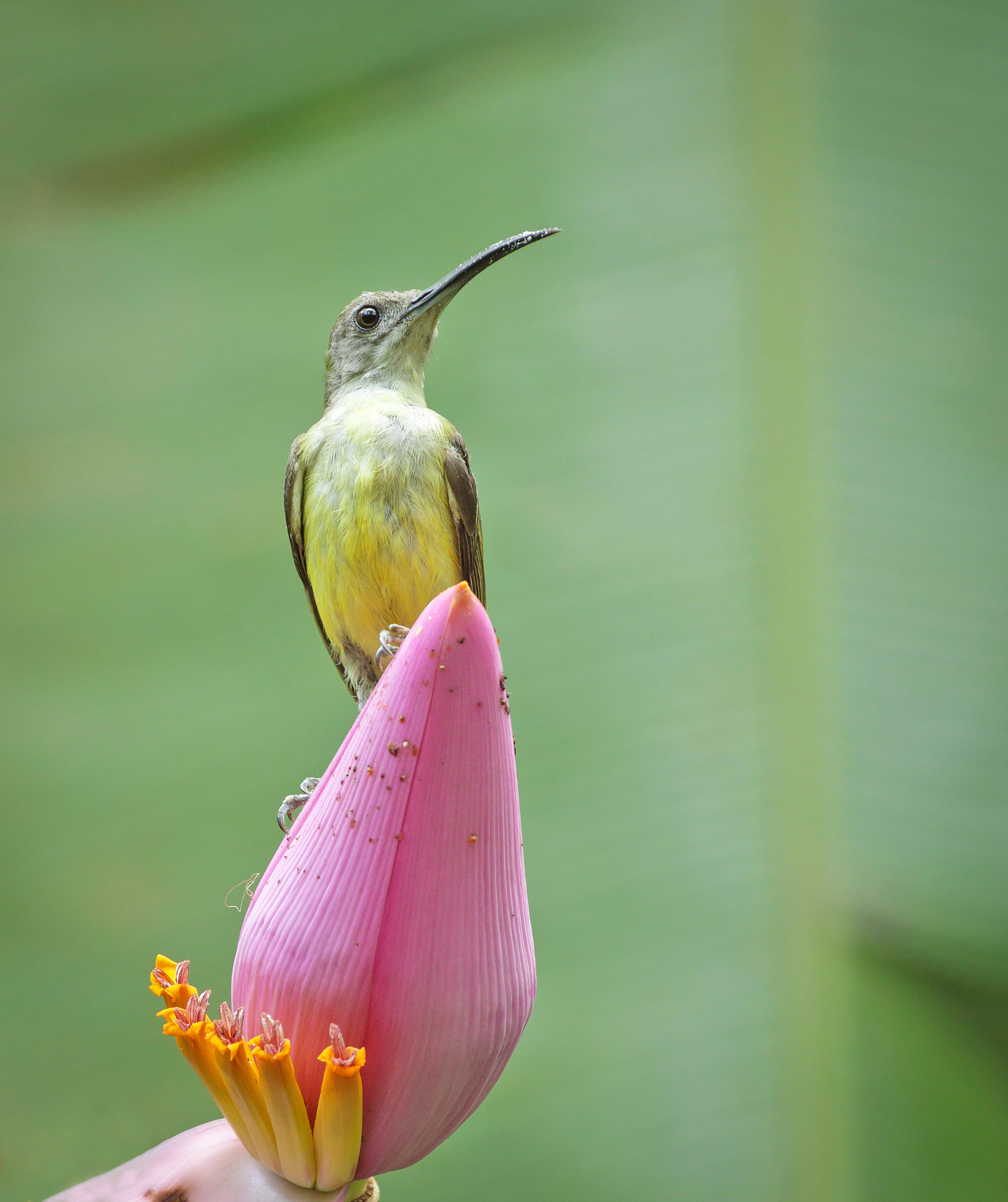
Little spiderhunter, Arachnothera longirostra

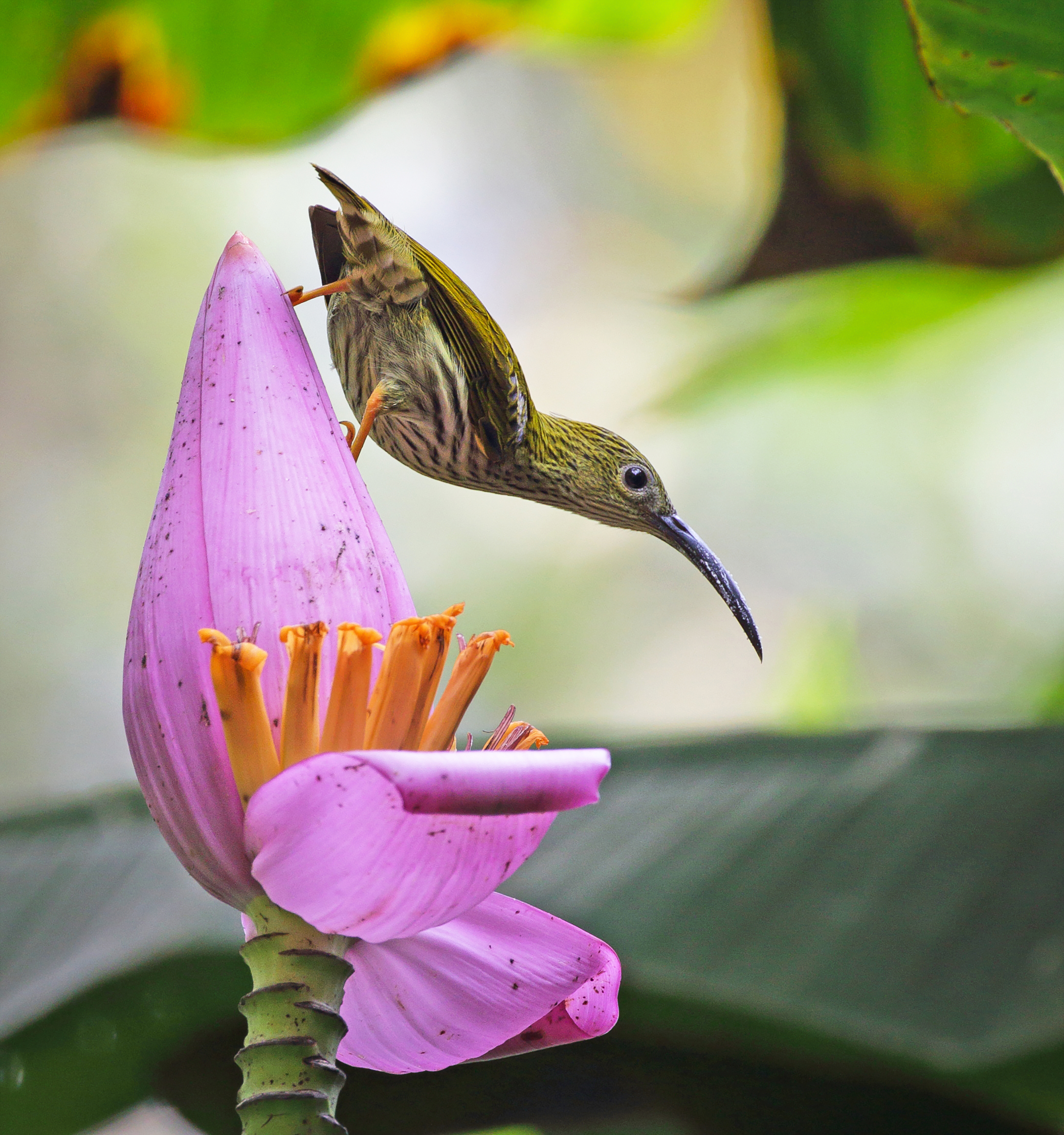
Streaked spiderhunter, Arachnothera magna

Order: Passeriformes Family: Nectariniidae

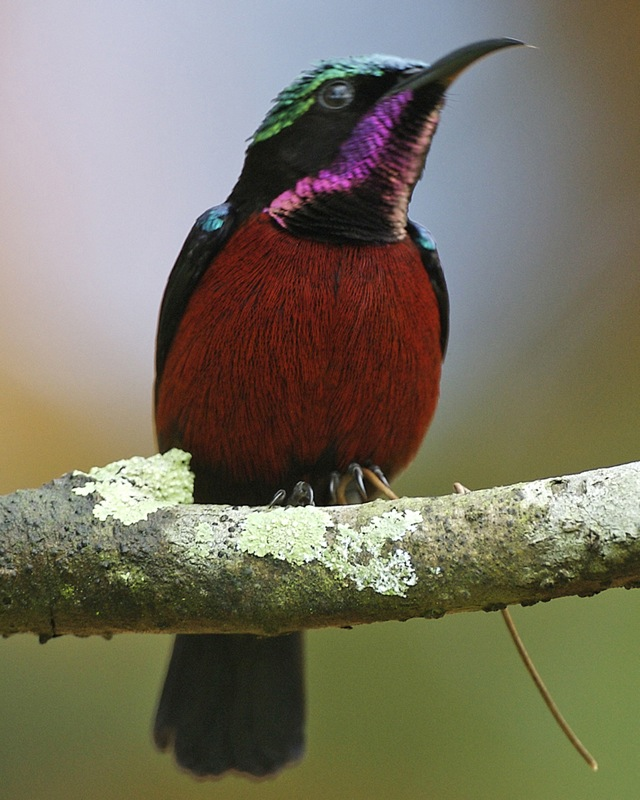
Van Hasselt's sunbird, Leptocoma brasiliana

The sunbirds and spiderhunters are very small passerine birds which feed largely on nectar, although they will also take insects, especially when feeding young. Flight is fast and direct on their short wings. Most species can take nectar by hovering like a hummingbird, but usually perch to feed.

- Ruby-cheeked sunbird, Chalcoparia singalensis
- Purple-rumped sunbird, Leptocoma zeylonica
- Van Hasselt's sunbird, Leptocoma brasiliana
- Purple sunbird, Cinnyris asiaticus
- Olive-backed sunbird, Cinnyris jugularis (A)
- Fire-tailed sunbird, Aethopyga ignicauda (A)
- Black-throated sunbird, Aethopyga saturata
- Mrs. Gould's sunbird, Aethopyga gouldiae (A)
- Green-tailed sunbird, Aethopyga nipalensis
- Crimson sunbird, Aethopyga siparaja
- Fire-tailed sunbird, Aethopyga ignicauda
- Little spiderhunter, Arachnothera longirostra
- Streaked spiderhunter, Arachnothera magna

== Fairy-bluebirds ==
Order: Passeriformes Family: Irenidae

The fairy-bluebirds are bulbul-like birds of open forest or thorn scrub. The males are dark-blue and the females a duller green.

- Asian fairy-bluebird, Irena puella

== Leafbirds ==
Order: Passeriformes Family: Chloropseidae

The leafbirds are small, bulbul-like birds. The males are brightly plumaged, usually in greens and yellows.

- Blue-winged leafbird, Chloropsis cochinchinensis
- Jerdon's leafbird, Chloropsis jerdoni (A)
- Golden-fronted leafbird, Chloropsis aurifrons
- Orange-bellied leafbird, Chloropsis hardwickii

== Weavers and allies ==
Order: Passeriformes Family: Ploceidae

The weavers are small passerine birds related to the finches. They are seed-eating birds with rounded conical bills. The males of many species are brightly coloured, usually in red or yellow and black, some species show variation in colour only in the breeding season.

- Streaked weaver, Ploceus manyar
- Baya weaver, Ploceus philippinus
- Black-breasted weaver, Ploceus benghalensis

== Waxbills and allies ==
Order: Passeriformes Family: Estrildidae

The estrildid finches are small passerine birds of the Old World tropics and Australasia. They are gregarious and often colonial seed eaters with short thick but pointed bills. They are all similar in structure and habits, but have wide variation in plumage colours and patterns.

- Red avadavat, Amandava amandava
- Indian silverbill, Euodice malabarica
- White-rumped munia, Lonchura striata
- Scaly-breasted munia, Lonchura punctulata
- Tricolored munia, Lonchura malacca
- Chestnut munia, Lonchura atricapilla

== Old World sparrows ==
Order: Passeriformes Family: Passeridae

Old World sparrows are small passerine birds. In general, sparrows tend to be small, plump, brown or grey birds with short tails and short powerful beaks. Sparrows are seed eaters, but they also consume small insects.

- House sparrow, Passer domesticus
- Eurasian tree sparrow, Passer montanus

== Wagtails and pipits ==
Order: Passeriformes Family: Motacillidae

Motacillidae is a family of small passerine birds with medium to long tails. They include the wagtails, longclaws and pipits. They are slender, ground feeding insectivores of open country.

- Forest wagtail, Dendronanthus indicus
- Gray wagtail, Motacilla cinerea
- Western yellow wagtail, Motacilla flava
- Eastern yellow wagtail, Motacilla tschutschensis
- Citrine wagtail, Motacilla citreola
- White-browed wagtail, Motacilla maderaspatensis
- White wagtail, Motacilla alba
- Richard's pipit, Anthus richardi
- Paddyfield pipit, Anthus rufulus
- Long-billed pipit, Anthus similis
- Blyth's pipit, Anthus godlewskii
- Tawny pipit, Anthus campestris
- Rosy pipit, Anthus roseatus
- Tree pipit, Anthus trivialis
- Olive-backed pipit, Anthus hodgsoni
- Red-throated pipit, Anthus cervinus (A)
- Water pipit, Anthus spinoletta

== Finches, euphonias, and allies ==
Order: Passeriformes Family: Fringillidae

Finches are seed-eating passerine birds, that are small to moderately large and have a strong beak, usually conical and in some species very large. All have twelve tail feathers and nine primaries. These birds have a bouncing flight with alternating bouts of flapping and gliding on closed wings, and most sing well.

- Common rosefinch, Carpodacus erythrinus (A)
- Scarlet finch, Haematospiza sipahi

== Old World buntings ==
Order: Passeriformes Family: Emberizidae

The emberizids are a large family of passerine birds. They are seed-eating birds with distinctively shaped bills. Many emberizid species have distinctive head patterns.

- Crested bunting, Emberiza lathami
- Black-headed bunting, Emberiza melanocephala (A)
- Red-headed bunting, Emberiza bruniceps
- Chestnut-eared bunting, Emberiza fucata
- Gray-necked bunting, Emberiza buchanani (A)
- Yellow-breasted bunting, Emberiza aureola
- Little bunting, Emberiza pusilla (A)
- Black-faced bunting, Emberiza spodocephala
- Tristram's bunting, Emberiza tristrami (A)

== See also ==
- List of birds
- Lists of birds by region
