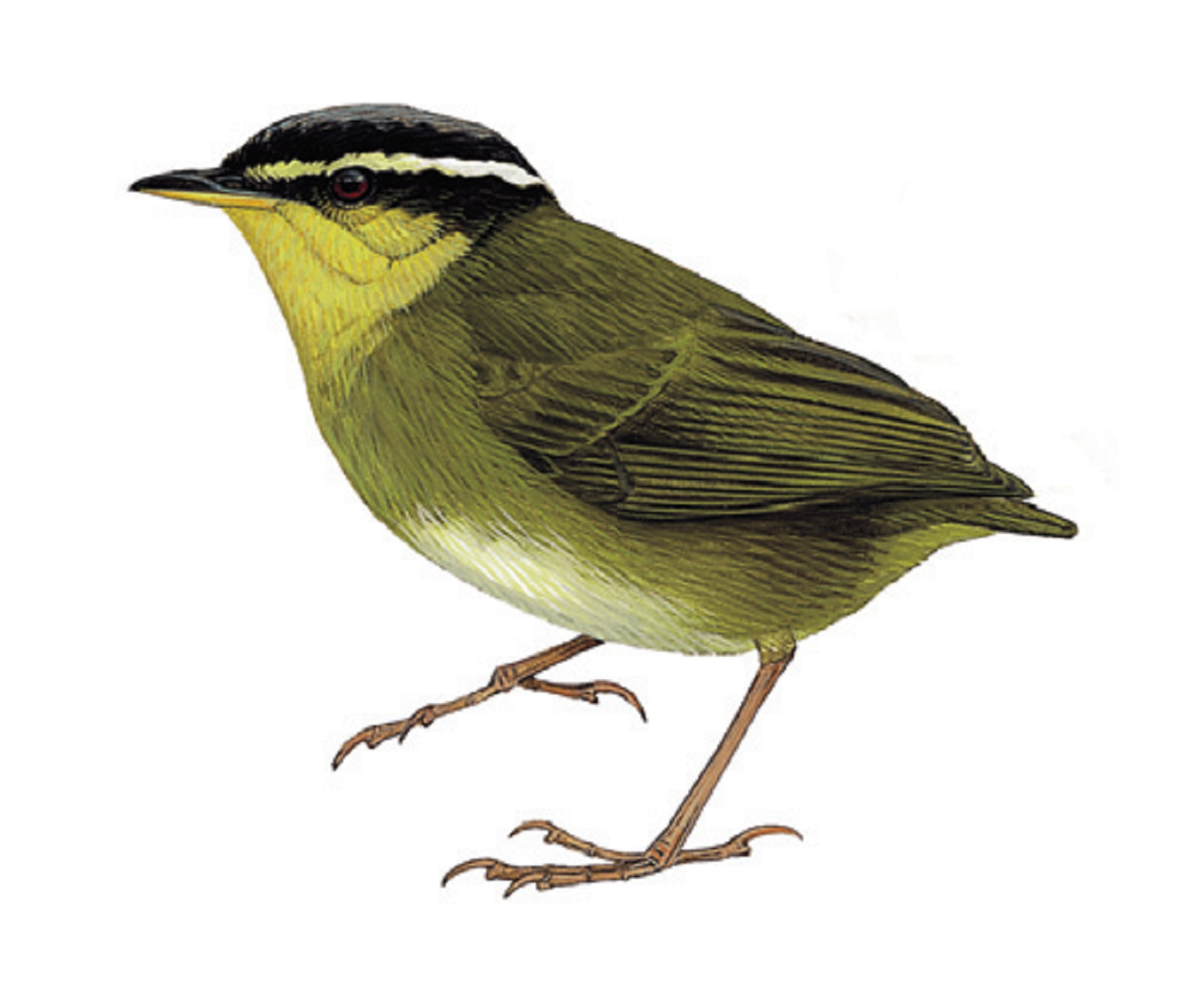

Conservation status
- Least Concern (IUCN 3.1)

Scientific classification
- Kingdom: Animalia
- Phylum: Chordata
- Class: Aves
- Order: Passeriformes
- Family: Cettiidae
- Genus: Hemitesia
- Species: H. neumanni

Binomial name
- Hemitesia neumanni (Rothschild, 1908)

Synonyms
- Urosphena neumanni; Sylvietta neumanni (protonym)

= Neumann's warbler =

Species of bird

Neumann's warbler (Hemitesia neumanni), also known as Neumann's short-tailed warbler, is a species of bird in the family Cettiidae. It is found in Democratic Republic of the Congo, Rwanda, and Uganda. Its natural habitat is subtropical or tropical moist montane forest.

== Taxonomy ==
Neumann's warbler was formally described in 1908 by the English zoologist Water Rothschild from specimens collected in a forested area west of Lake Tanganyika. He proposed the binomial name Sylvietta neumanni. Neumann's warbler is now placed with the pale-footed bush warbler in the genus Hemitesia that was introduced in 1948 by James Chaplin. The genus name combines the Ancient Greek hēmi- meaning "half-" or "small" with the genus Teslia that had been introduced by Brian Hodgson in 1837. The specific epithet neumanni was chosen to honour the German ornithologist Oscar Neumann. The species is monotypic: no subspecies are recognised.

Neumann's warbler is the only species in the family Cettiidae that is found in Subsaharan Africa.

== Distribution and habitat ==
This warbler lives in thick undergrowth of montane forest, often near streams, in eastern Democratic Republic of the Congo, southwest Uganda, western Rwanda and western Burundi.

== Description ==
Neumann's warbler is a small bird with an overall length of 10–11 cm (3.9–4.3 in) and a weight of 11.3 g (0.40 oz). It has a large head with a distinctive striped pattern and a very short tail. The broad supercilium is grey-brown and present in front of the eye as a dull greenish and white pattern.

The voice is a loud song ("tee-tiyoo-tee", "tee-tyer-tyii", "tyoowi-tyee", "tee-teeyoo-tyoowi" or "tay-tiyoo-tay") intermixing with almost inaudible lipsing notes, and is repeated at regular intervals.
