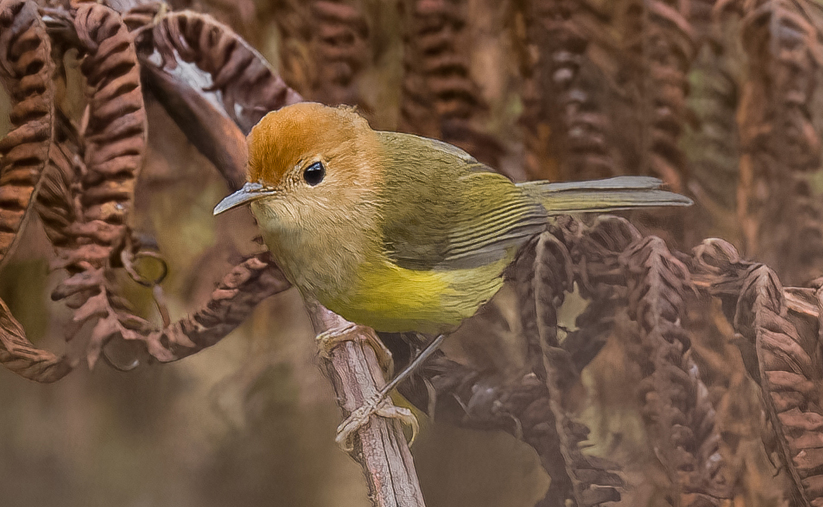

Conservation status
- Least Concern (IUCN 3.1)

Scientific classification
- Kingdom: Animalia
- Phylum: Chordata
- Class: Aves
- Order: Passeriformes
- Family: Cettiidae
- Genus: Phyllergates
- Species: P. heterolaemus

Binomial name
- Phyllergates heterolaemus Mearns, 1905
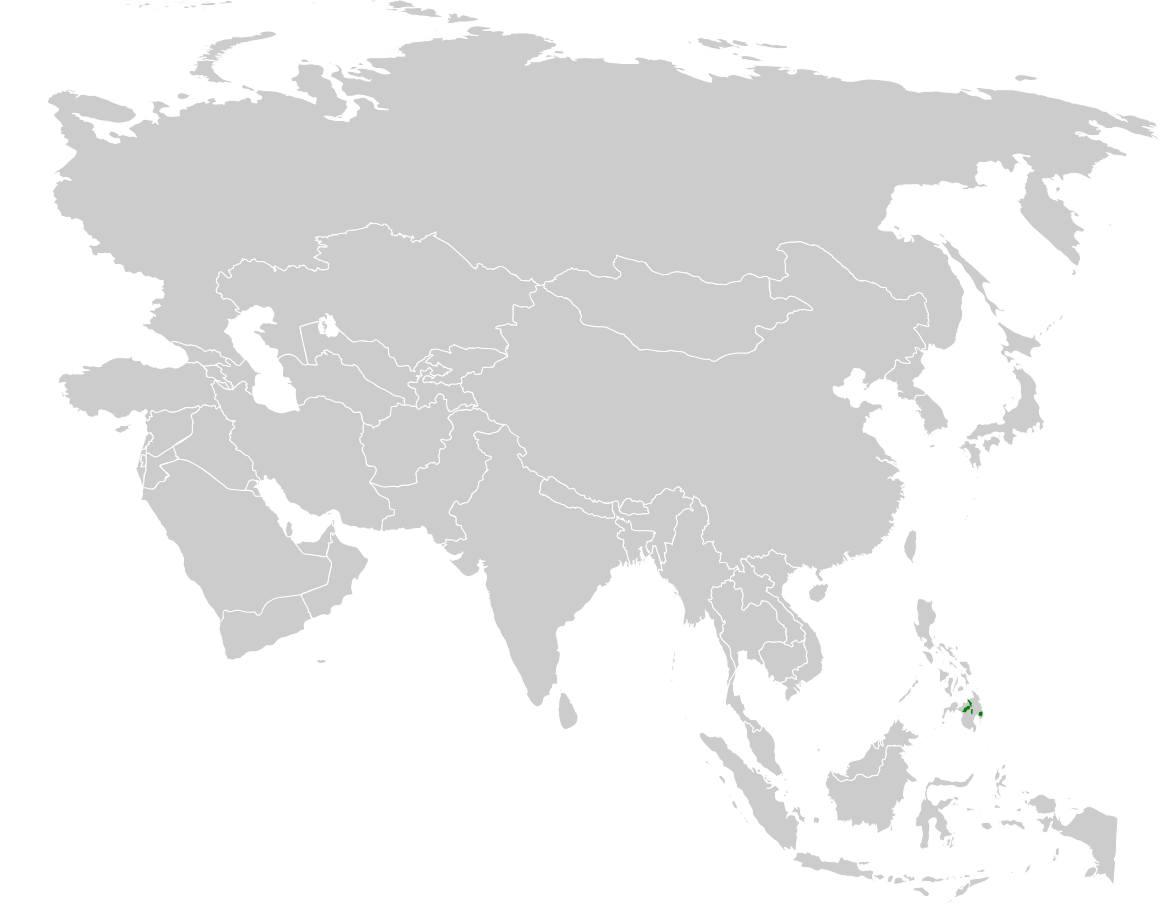

Synonyms
- Orthotomus heterolaemus

= Rufous-headed tailorbird =

Species of bird

The rufous-headed tailorbird (Phyllergates heterolaemus) is a species of bird in the family Cettiidae. It is found only in the Philippines on the island of Mindanao. Its natural habitats are in tropical moist montane forest.

== Description and taxonomy ==
It was formerly conspecific with the Mountain tailorbird but differs greatly in plumage.

== Behaviour and ecology ==
Diet is presusmed to be tiny invertebrates. Typically seen in pairs or small family parties deep within tangled vegetation. Relative to the Mountain tailorbird, it does not cock its tail as much.

No information is known about its breeding.

== Habitat and conservation status ==
The species inhabits forest understorey and edge, second growth and grassy clearings at altitude over 1,000 meters above sea level. The IUCN has assessed this species Least Concern. Despite its limited range, it is said to be locally common. However, its population is declining. It is still affected by habitat loss through deforestation, mining, land conversion and slash-and-burn. Relative to lowland forest, Mindanao's montane forest has stayed relatively intact due to its relative inaccessibility and ruggedness.
