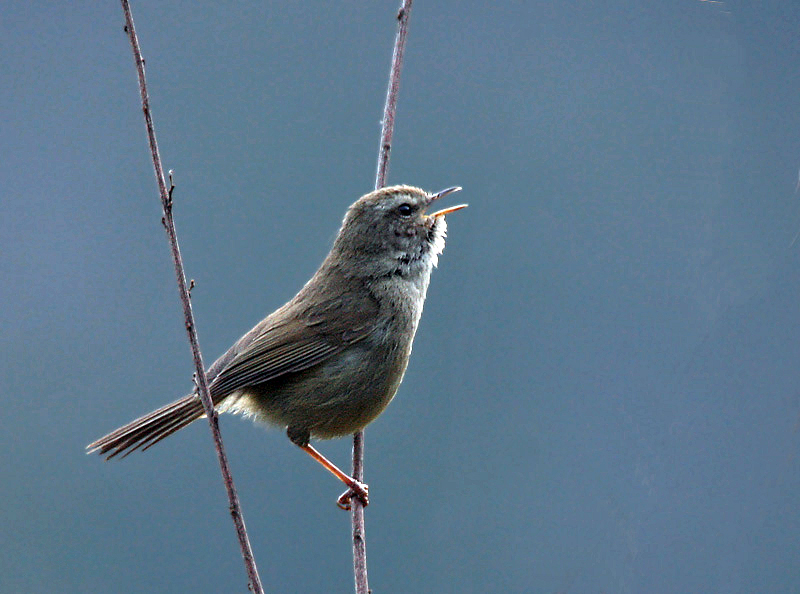
- The brown-flanked bush warbler (Horornis fortipes)

Scientific classification
- Kingdom: Animalia
- Phylum: Chordata
- Class: Aves
- Order: Passeriformes
- Family: Cettiidae
- Genus: Horornis; Hodgson, 1845

Type species
- Horornis fortipes Hodgson, 1845

Species
- See text

= Horornis =

Genus of birds

Horornis is a genus of small insectivorous songbirds ("warblers") which make up the core of the newly recognized family Cettiidae. They were formerly placed in the Sylviidae, which at that time was a wastebin taxon for the warbler-like Sylvioidea. The range of this genus occurs from southeast Asia throughout the western Pacific. The most recently described species is the Bougainville bush warbler (Horornis haddeni) from Bougainville Island that was first formally described in 2006.

== Taxonomy ==
The genus Horornis was introduced in 1845 by the English naturalist Brian Houghton Hodgson. He listed two type species but in 1881 Henry Seebohm selected Horornis fortipes Hodgson, the brown-flanked bush warbler. The genus name combines the Ancient Greek ορος/oros, ορεος/oreos meaning "hill" with ορνις/ornis meaning "bird".

This genus has been split from the genus Cettia. Cetti's warbler (C. cetti), the previous type species, seems close to the genus Tesia from Southeast Asia and neighboring regions. Birds in the genus Horornis, such as the famous uguisu (Japanese bush warbler, H. diphone) and the brown-flanked bush warbler (H. fortipes) belong to a group that might include the aberrant broad-billed warbler (Tickellia hodgsoni). This latter species differs wildly in its gaudy colors but in habitus is a typical "bush warbler".

These typical bush warblers share the lifestyle and related adaptations and apomorphies with Bradypterus, the other genus called bush warblers. However, Bradypterus is related to the grass warblers of Locustella and Megalurus and is more distant from Cettia. Both "bush warbler" genera are smallish birds well adapted to climbing among shrubbery. They are markedly long-tailed birds, at first glance somewhat reminiscent of wrens.

These are quite terrestrial birds, which live in densely vegetated habitats such as thick forest and reedbeds. They will walk away from disturbance rather than flush. The plumage similarities and skulking lifestyle makes these birds hard to see and identify.

These bush warblers tend towards rich or greyish browns above and buffish or light grey tones below. They have little patterning apart from the ubiquitous supercilium. Altogether, they appear much like the plainer species among Acrocephalus marsh warblers in coloration. Megalurid bush warblers tend to be somewhat slimmer and have a very long and pointed tail, but are otherwise very similar.

== Species ==
The genus contains 12 species:

Image	Common name	Scientific name	Distribution
	Manchurian bush warbler	Horornis canturians	northeastern China.
	Japanese bush warbler	Horornis diphone	Japan
	Philippine bush warbler	Horornis seebohmi	Philippines.
	Palau bush warbler	Horornis annae	Palau.
	Shade bush warbler	Horornis parens	Solomon Islands
	Bougainville bush warbler	Horornis haddeni	Bougainville Island in the Solomon Islands, Papua New Guinea
	Fiji bush warbler	Horornis ruficapilla	Fiji.
	Tanimbar bush warbler	Horornis carolinae	Yamdena
	Brown-flanked bush warbler	Horornis fortipes	South Asia
	Aberrant bush warbler	Horornis flavolivaceus	Himalayas, southern China, northern Indochina and montane Malesia
	Yellow-bellied bush warbler	Horornis acanthizoides	mainland China and Taiwan
	Hume's bush warbler	Horornis brunnescens	Himalayas of Nepal and India.

== Sources ==
- Alström, P.; Ericson, P.G.P.; Olsson, U.; Sundberg, P. (2006). "Phylogeny and classification of the avian superfamily Sylvioidea" (PDF). Mol. Phylogenet. Evol. 38 (2): 381–397. doi:10.1016/j.ympev.2005.05.015. PMID 16054402. Archived from the original (PDF) on 2021-06-27.
- del Hoyo, Josep; Elliott, Andrew & Sargatal, Jordi (eds.) (2006): Handbook of Birds of the World (Volume 11: Old World Flycatchers to Old World Warblers). Lynx Edicions, Barcelona. ISBN 84-96553-06-X
- Fuchs, J.; Fjeldså, J.; Bowie, R.C.K.; Voelker, G.; Pasquet, E. (2006). "The African warbler genus Hyliota as a lost lineage in the Oscine songbird tree: Molecular support for an African origin of the Passerida". Mol. Phylogenet. Evol. 39 (1): 186–197. doi:10.1016/j.ympev.2005.07.020.
