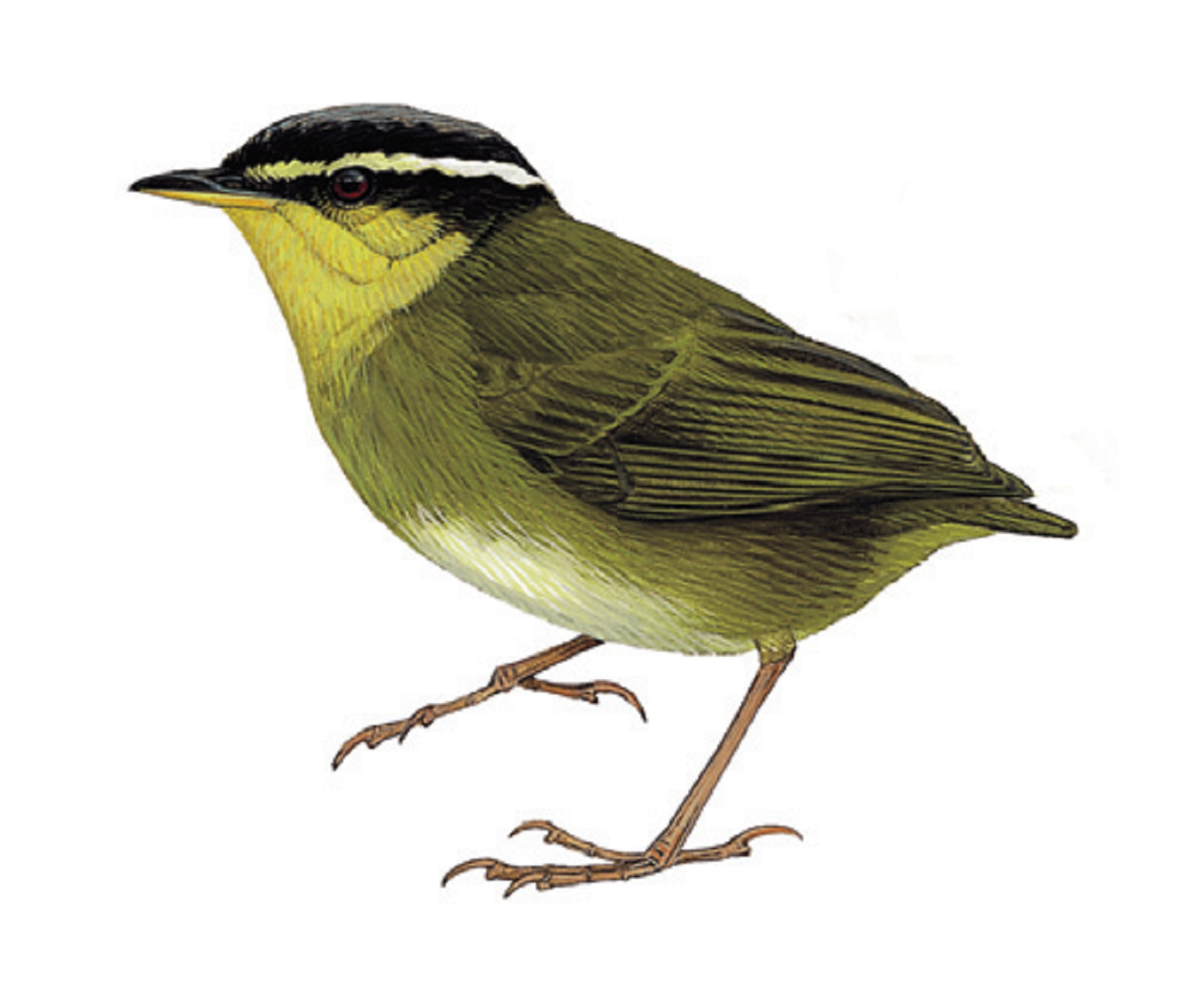
- Neumann's warbler

Scientific classification
- Kingdom: Animalia
- Phylum: Chordata
- Class: Aves
- Order: Passeriformes
- Family: Cettiidae
- Genus: Hemitesia; Chapin, 1948

Type species
- Sylvietta neumanni (Neumann's warbler) Rothchild, 1908

= Hemitesia =

Genus of birds

Hemitesia is a genus of Old World warblers in the family Cettiidae, formerly classified in the family Sylviidae. The genus was erected by James Chapin in 1948.

== Taxonomy ==
The genus Hemitesia was introduced in 1948 by the American ornithologist James Chapin with Neumann's warbler as the type species. The name combines the Ancient Greek hēmi- meaning "half-" or "small" with the genus Teslia that had been introduced by Brian Hodgson in 1837. The genus is placed in the family Cettiidae and is sister to the genus Urosphena.

The genus contains two species:

- Pale-footed bush warbler, Hemitesia pallidipes
- Neumann's warbler, Hemitesia neumanni
