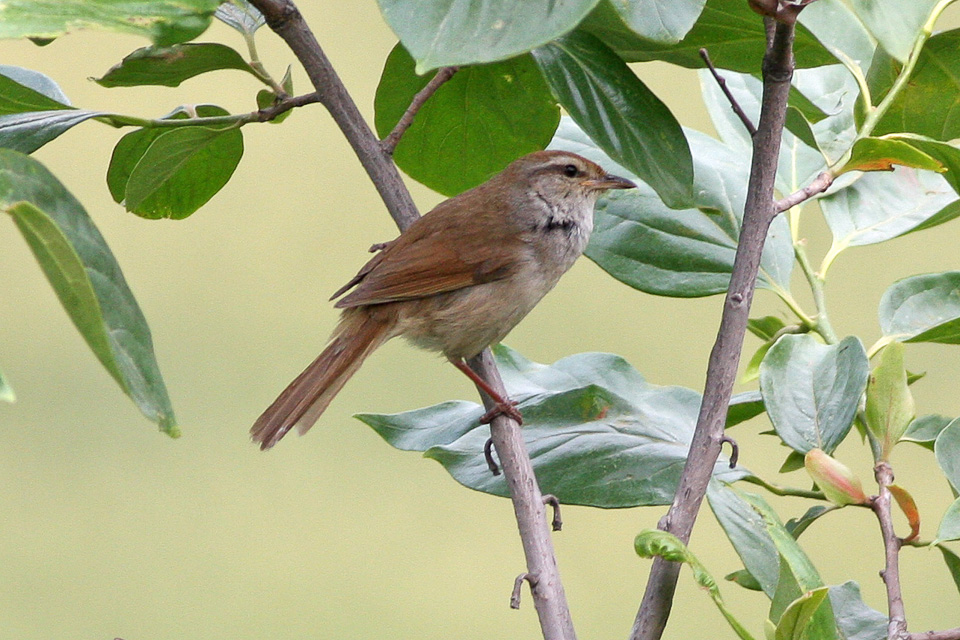

Conservation status
- Least Concern (IUCN 3.1)

Scientific classification
- Kingdom: Animalia
- Phylum: Chordata
- Class: Aves
- Order: Passeriformes
- Family: Cettiidae
- Genus: Horornis
- Species: H. canturians

Binomial name
- Horornis canturians (R. Swinhoe, 1860)

Synonyms
- Cettia borealis; Cettia canturians; Horornis borealis

= Manchurian bush warbler =

Species of bird

The Manchurian bush warbler (Horornis canturians), also known as Korean bush warbler, is a bird in the family Cettiidae. The species was first described by Robert Swinhoe in 1860. It is found and known to breed in northeastern China.

The estimated distribution size is reported to be a large range – approximately 1,610,000 km^{2} (620,000 sq mi). Although the global population has not been measured, the population trend appears to be stable. Because of this, the Manchurian bush warbler is evaluated as a least concern species.

This warbler prefers rich temperate forest found on the Asian territories. Some of those places are eastern Siberia, Mongolia and Korea. It can also be spotted in parts of northern China. They have an inclination toward being in scrubs and woodlands that define geographical and then they are less common in urban environments.

This bird is typically known to live in the shrubby forest edges, reedbeds, and gardens. Even when singing, they rarely stray from the dense undergrowth. These birds are usually detected by their song which is a long mournful whistle followed up by a quick burst of rich bubbly notes. Its vocalizations have been described as "explosive" and "trilling." They become especially vocal during the breeding season. The male serenade females with melodic tunes to show that establish territory and help to attract mates. The songs they use to get a mate can often echo through the dense habitats, getting the attention of those who are nearby.

The Manchurian bush-warbler are often found foraging alone or in small pairs and is the most active in the morning.

The mating and nesting take place in late April and July. They make their nest low to the ground in dense underbrush. They use a mix of grass, leaves, and feathers for insulation. The female will typically lay three to five eggs. Then she will incubate for about two weeks. Once the hatched both males and females will engage in feeding the baby chicks. This cooperative breeding behavior is critical for the survival of the young.

Natural predators of the Manchurian Bush-Warblers are not immune to threats; the natural predators include birds of prey. Their camouflage and habit of staying low to the ground help mitigate some of the risk. Some of the predators of the bush-warblers are hawks, snakes and small mammals that raid their nests. The predation remains a significant part of their life cycle and influencing their behavior and nesting practices.

Although it is often confused for Japanese bush warbler, this bird can be distinguished from the Japanese bush warbler by its more rufous colors, underparts with dark buff suffusion on flanks, and undertail coverts.

This bird is also known to have similarities to the Broad-billed warbler; however, this bush warbler has a pale supercilium, is smaller in size, has a slender build, a rufescent crown, and less buffy underparts.

Their conservation status currently the IUCN red list classifies the Manchurian bush-warblers as a species of least concern. However, their habitat destruction and degradation due to the urbanization and agricultural expansion poses a potential risk to the populations in various regions. The conservation efforts that focus on the habitat preservation is essential to ensure that this charming bird counties to thrive in its natural environment.

Human impact on the Manchurian bush-warbler. Human activity is undeniably having an impact on their habitats. Pollution, deforestation, and land conversion have altered their natural landscapes. This makes it more challenging for them to find suitable nesting locations.
