= Bush-warbler =

Group of birds

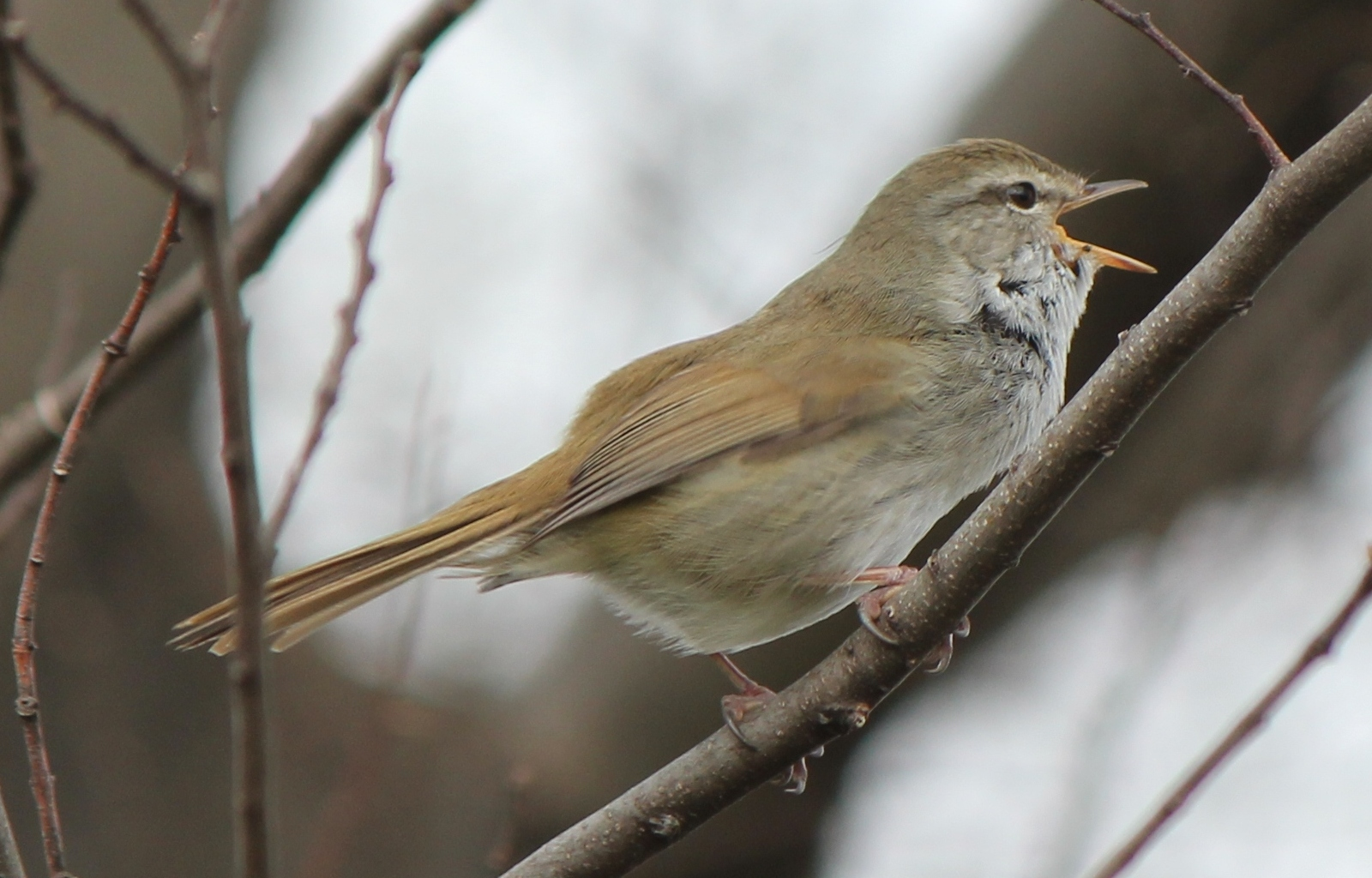
The Japanese bush-warbler (Horornis diphone) probably belongs in a different genus.

Bush-warblers (or bush warblers) are small insectivorous songbirds of the genera Cettia, Horornis, and Bradypterus. They were formerly placed in the "wastebin" Old World warbler family. None of the genera as traditionally delimited are believed to be monophyletic.

Due to their external similarity convergently acquired by strong selective pressures due to the identical habitat, they were occasionally believed to be close relatives. However, they belong to two well-distant families in the Sylvioidea, the "warbler-and-babbler" superfamily:

- Cettia, the cettiid bush-warblers or typical bush-warblers, belong in the Cettiidae, an ancient sylvioid lineage related to long-tailed tits.
- Horornis, the horornid bush-warblers, also belonging in the Cettiidae, an ancient sylvioid lineage related to long-tailed tits.
- Bradypterus, the megalurid bush-warblers, belong to the Locustellidae, the grass-warbler family which is closely related to the Malagasy warblers and the peculiar black-capped donacobius from South America, formerly believed to be an aberrant wren.
