= Bougainville bush warbler =

Conservation status
- Near Threatened (IUCN 3.1)

Scientific classification
- Kingdom: Animalia
- Phylum: Chordata
- Class: Aves
- Order: Passeriformes
- Family: Cettiidae
- Genus: Horornis
- Species: H. haddeni

Binomial name
- Horornis haddeni (LeCroy & Barker, 2006)

Synonyms
- Cettia haddeni

Species of bird

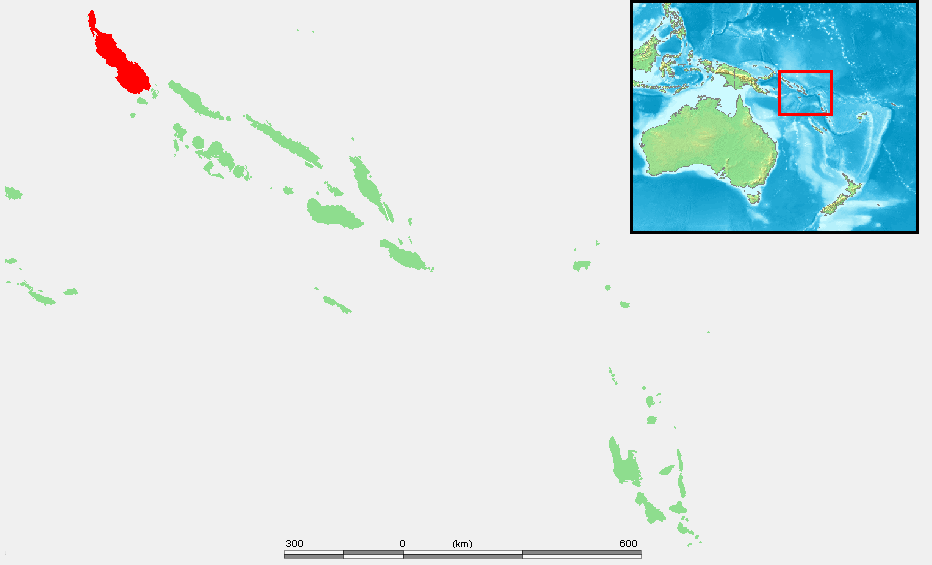
The Bougainville bush warbler is found on Bougainville Island

The Bougainville bush warbler or odedi (Horornis haddeni) is a bird species initially placed in the "Old World warbler" assemblage, but nowadays moved with its congeners to the new cettiid warbler family.

It was described as new to science in 2006. This bird is only known from the Crown Prince Range on Bougainville Island in the Solomon Islands, Papua New Guinea.

Its status was first evaluated for the IUCN Red List in 2008, being listed as near threatened.
