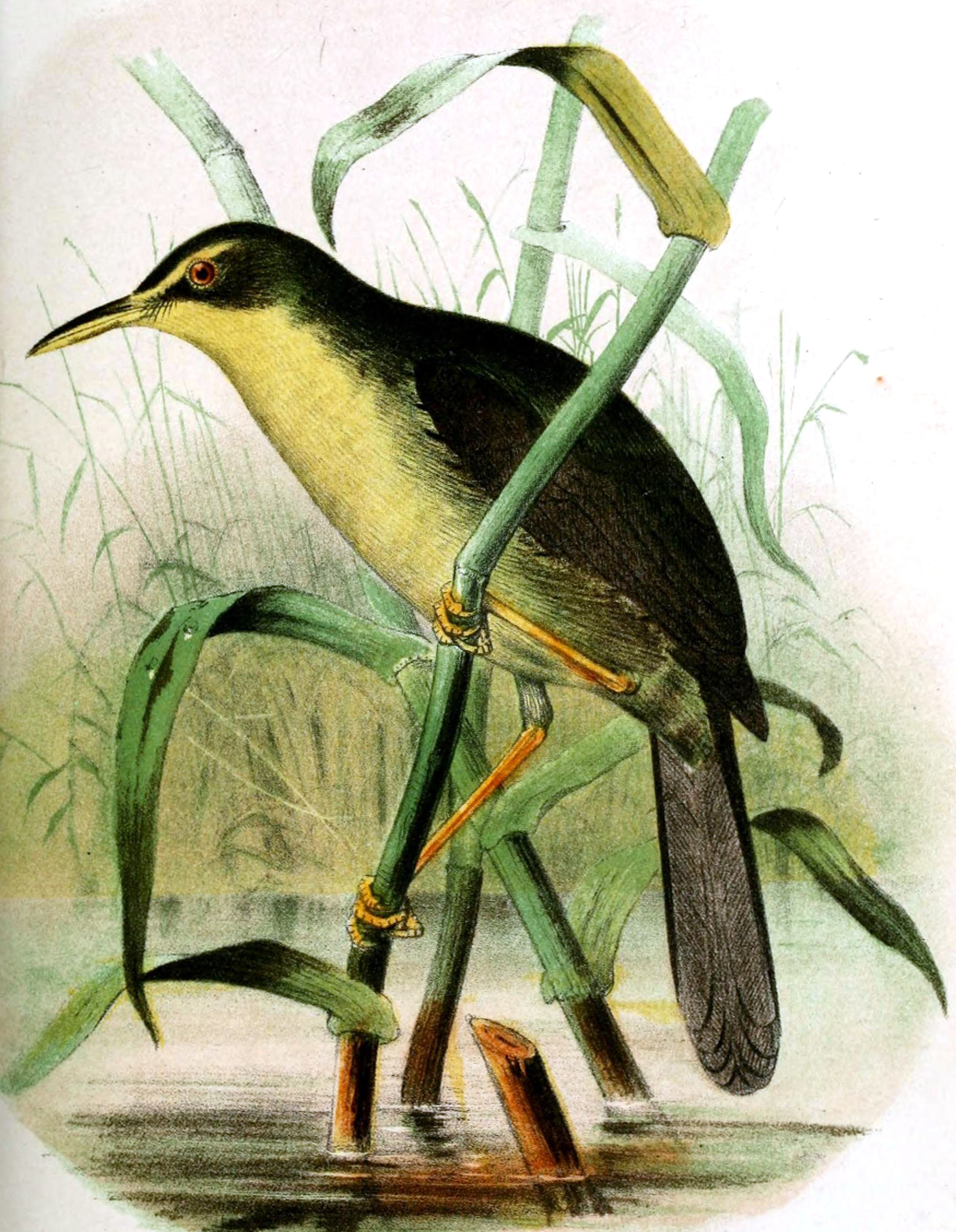

Conservation status
- Least Concern (IUCN 3.1)

Scientific classification
- Kingdom: Animalia
- Phylum: Chordata
- Class: Aves
- Order: Passeriformes
- Family: Cettiidae
- Genus: Horornis
- Species: H. annae

Binomial name
- Horornis annae (Hartlaub & Finsch, 1868)

Synonyms
- Cettia annae

= Palau bush warbler =

Species of bird

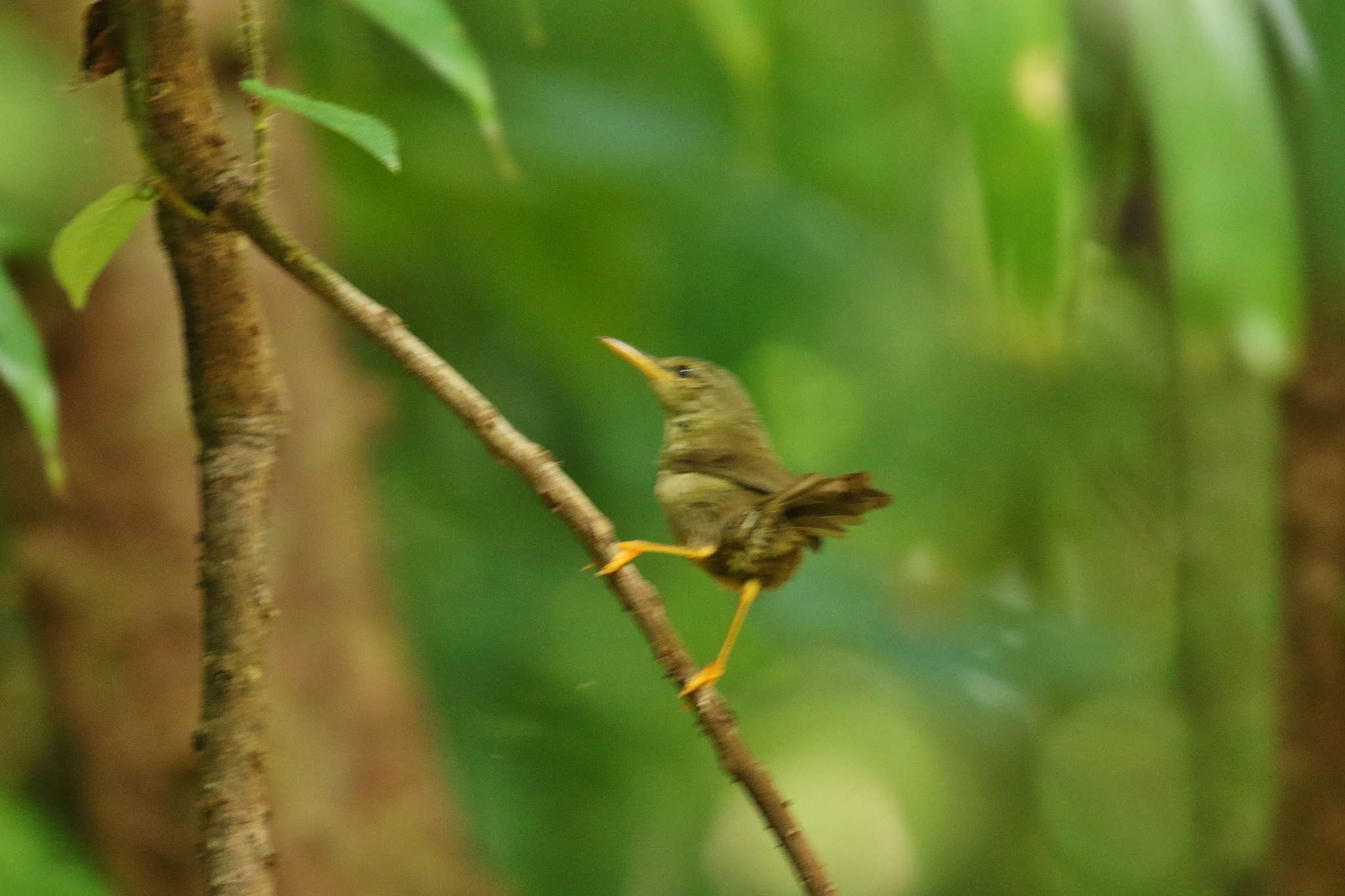
Live bird

The Palau bush warbler (Horornis annae) is a species of Old World warbler in the family Cettiidae. It is found only in Palau.
