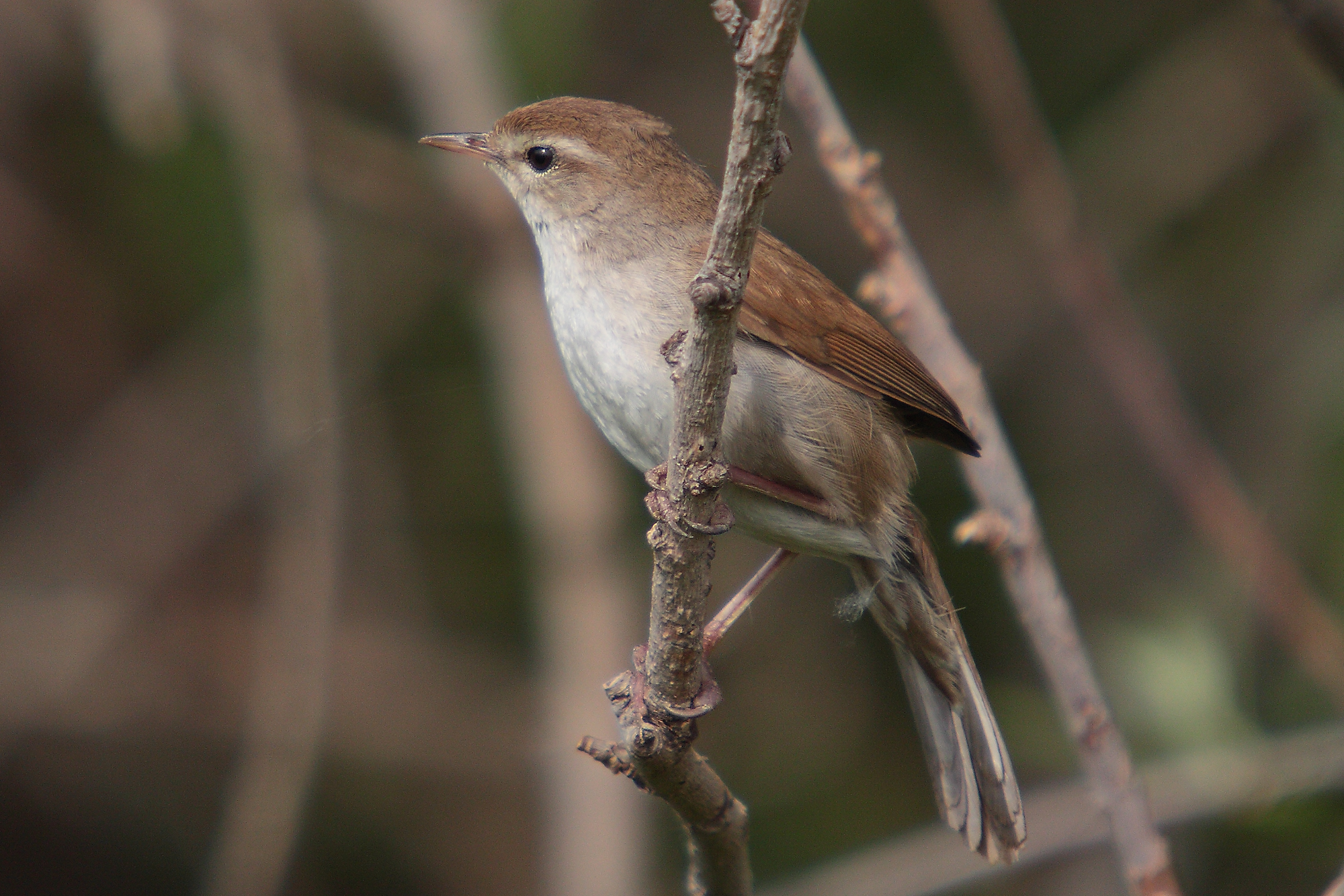
- Cetti's warbler, Cettia cetti

Scientific classification
- Kingdom: Animalia
- Phylum: Chordata
- Class: Aves
- Order: Passeriformes
- Superfamily: Aegithaloidea
- Family: Cettiidae; Alström, Ericson, Olsson, & Sundberg, 2006

Genera
- Scotocerca; Abroscopus; Phyllergates; Tickellia; Horornis; Tesia; Cettia; Urosphena; Hemitesia

= Cettiidae =

Family of birds

Cettiidae is a newly validated family of small insectivorous songbirds ("warblers"), formerly placed in the Old World warbler "wastebin" assemblage. It contains the typical bush warblers (Cettia) and their relatives. As a common name, cettiid warblers is usually used.

Some taxonomic authorities include this entire family, along with the related genera Erythrocercus and Scotocerca, in an enlarged family Scotocercidae; an invalid treatment as Cettiidae (published in 2006) has priority over Scotocercidae (published in 2012).

Its members occur mainly in Asia, ranging into Oceania and Europe. The pseudo-tailorbirds, tesias and stubtails, as well as Tickellia and Abroscopus warblers, are mostly found in the forests of south and southeastern Asia, with one species of stubtail reaching as far north as Japan and Siberia. Only one species, Neumann's warbler (Hemitesia neumanni), occurs in Africa. The range of the genus Cettia extends west to Western Europe, while that of Horornis extends well into the Pacific, as far as Fiji and Palau. Most of the species in the family are sedentary, but the Asian stubtail is wholly migratory and the Japanese bush warbler and Cetti's warbler are partly migratory over much of their range. A few species, such as the pale-footed bush warbler, are altitudinal migrants.

The species are small, stubby birds. Most have moderately long to long tails, while the stubtails and tesias have tiny tails that do not even emerge past their tail coverts. The group is typically clad in dull plumage, often with a line above the eye, but some are more colourful. Altogether the Cettiidae are a quite variable group containing many aberrant birds that hitherto had been uncomfortably placed with a wide range of unrelated families. The Locustellidae, which contain birds which appear very similar to many cettiids, are far more uniform by contrast.

Most live in scrubland and frequently hunt food by clambering through thick tangled growth.

== Taxonomy ==
The family Cettiidae was introduced by Per Alström and coworkers in 2006.

The following cladogram showing the family relationships is based on a study by Carl Oliveros and coworkers published in 2019. The number of species is taken from the AviList checklist.

- - Aegithaloidea
    - - Phylloscopidae – leaf warblers (80 species)
      - - Hyliidae – hylias (2 species)
        - - Aegithalidae – bushtits (11 species)
          - - Erythrocercidae – bristle flycatchers (3 species)
            - Cettiidae – bush warblers and allies (32 species)

The phylogenetic relationships between eight of the genera were determined in a 2011 study by Per Alström and coworkers. The streaked scrub warbler was not sampled in this study. The basal position shown here is based on the 2019 study by Carl Oliveros and coworkers. The streaked scrub warbler is estimated to have shared a common ancestor with the rest of the family around 16 million years ago.

- Cettiidae
  - Scotocerca – streaked scrub warbler
  - - - - - Hemitesia – (2 species)
          - Urosphena – stubtails (3 species)
        - - Tesia – tesias (4 species)
          - Cettia – (4 species)
      - - Abroscopus – warblers (3 species)
        - - Phyllergates – tailorbirds (2 species)
          - - Tickellia – Broad-billed warbler
            - Horornis – bush warblers (13 species)

The family contains 32 species in nine genera.

Image	Genus	Living species
	Scotocerca (Cretzschmar, 1830)	Streaked scrub warbler (Scotocerca inquieta)
	Abroscopus Baker, 1930 – warblers	Rufous-faced warbler (Abroscopus albogularis); Black-faced warbler (Abroscopus schisticeps); Yellow-bellied warbler (Abroscopus superciliaris)
	Phyllergates Sharpe, 1883 – tailorbirds	Mountain tailorbird (Phyllergates cucullatus); Rufous-headed tailorbird (Phyllergates heterolaemus)
	Tickellia Blyth, 1861 – broad-billed warbler	Broad-billed warbler (Tickellia hodgsoni)
	Horornis Hodgson, 1845 – bush warblers	Manchurian bush warbler (Horornis canturians); Japanese bush warbler (Horornis diphone); Philippine bush warbler (Horornis seebohmi); Palau bush warbler (Horornis annae); Shade bush warbler (Horornis parens); Bougainville bush warbler (Horornis haddeni); Fiji bush warbler (Horornis ruficapilla); Tanimbar bush warbler (Horornis carolinae); Brown-flanked bush warbler (Horornis fortipes); Aberrant bush warbler (Horornis flavolivacea); Yellow-bellied bush warbler (Horornis acanthizoides); Hume's bush warbler (Horornis brunnescens)
	Tesia Hodgson, 1837 – tesias	Slaty-bellied tesia (Tesia olivea); Grey-bellied tesia (Tesia cyaniventer); Javan tesia (Tesia superciliaris); Russet-capped tesia (Tesia everetti)
	Cettia Bonaparte, 1834 – typical bush warblers	Chestnut-crowned bush warbler (Cettia major); Chestnut-headed tesia (Cettia castaneocoronata); Grey-sided bush warbler (Cettia brunnifrons); Cetti's warbler (Cettia cetti)
	Urosphena R. Swinhoe, 1877 – stubtails	Asian stubtail (Urosphena squameiceps); Timor stubtail (Urosphena subulata); Bornean stubtail (Urosphena whiteheadi)
	Hemitesia Chapin, 1948 – warblers	Pale-footed bush warbler (Hemitesia pallidipes); Neumann's warbler (Hemitesia neumanni)

== Sources ==
- del Hoyo, Josep; Elliott, Andrew & Sargatal, Jordi (eds.) (2006): Handbook of Birds of the World (Volume 11: Old World Flycatchers to Old World Warblers). Lynx Edicions, Barcelona. ISBN 84-96553-06-X
- Sefc, K.M.; Payne, R.B. & Sorenson, M.D. (2003): Phylogenetic relationships of African sunbird-like warblers: Moho Hypergerus atriceps, Green Hylia Hylia prasina and Tit-hylia Pholidornis rushiae. Ostrich 74(1-2): 8-17. PDF fulltext
