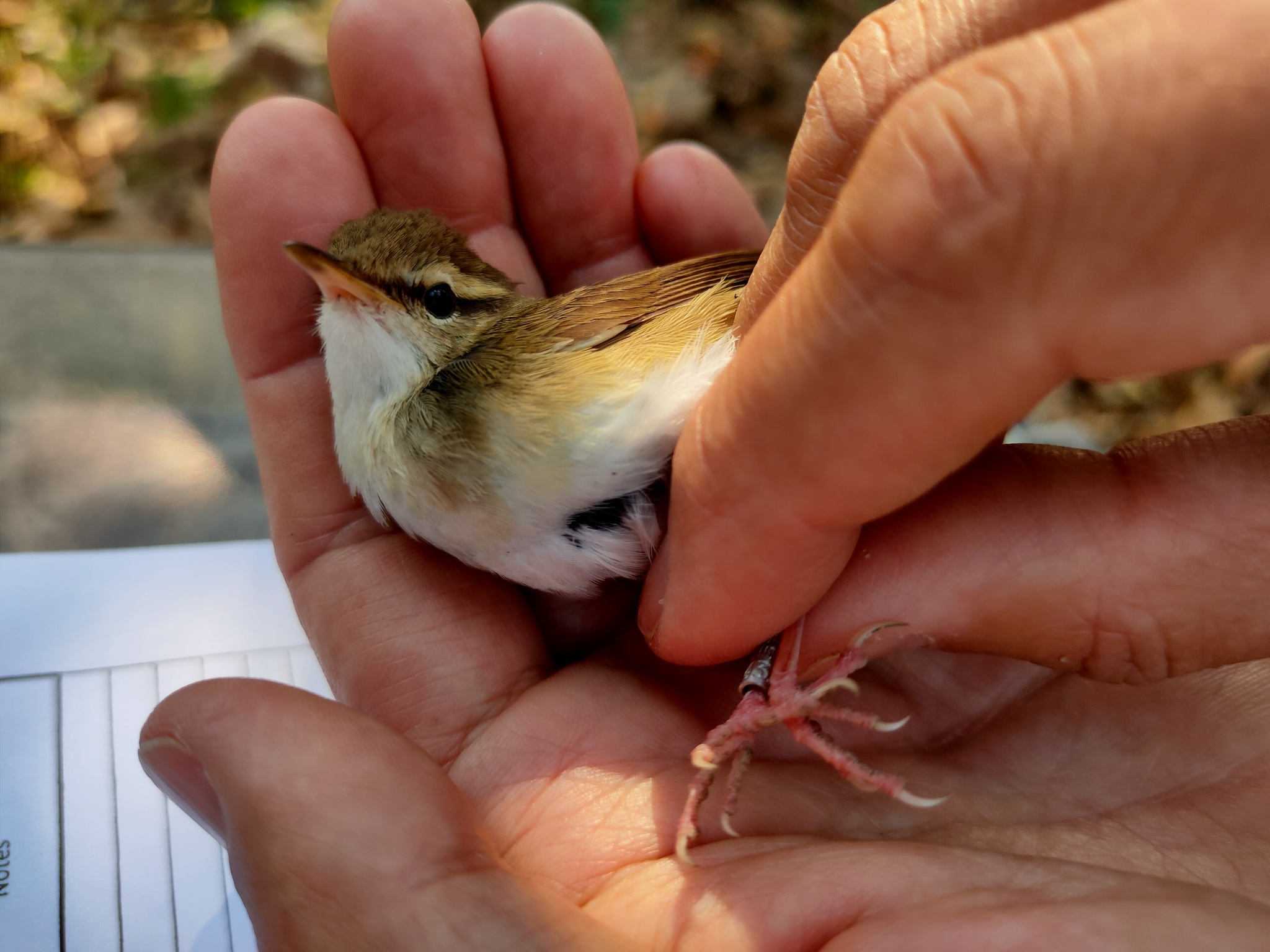
- in Chiang Rai, Thailand

Conservation status
- Least Concern (IUCN 3.1)

Scientific classification
- Kingdom: Animalia
- Phylum: Chordata
- Class: Aves
- Order: Passeriformes
- Family: Cettiidae
- Genus: Hemitesia
- Species: H. pallidipes

Binomial name
- Hemitesia pallidipes (Blanford, 1872)

Synonyms
- Cettia pallidipes; Phylloscopus pallidipes; Horeites pallidipes; Horornis pallidipes; Urosphena pallidipes

= Pale-footed bush warbler =

Species of bird

The pale-footed bush warbler (Hemitesia pallidipes) is a species of oriental warbler in the family Cettiidae that is found in southern Asia. It occurs in the Himalayan region west from Dehradun through the foothills of Nepal to northeastern India. It also occurs in Myanmar, Laos, northern Vietnam and southern China. A single sighting was recorded from Kandy, Sri Lanka in March 1993.

== Taxonomy ==
The pale-footed bush warbler was formally described in 1872 by the English naturalist William Blandford under the binomial name Phylloscopus pallidipes. The specific epithet pallidipes combines the Latin pallidus meaning "pale" with pes meaning "foot". This warbler is now placed in the genus Hemitesia that was introduced by James Chapin in 1948.

Three subspecies are recognised:

- H. p. pallidipes (Blanford, 1872) – Himalayas to west Yunnan (south China) and north Myanmar
- H. p. laurentei La Touche, 1921 – central Myanmar and south east Yunnan (south China) to Vietnam
- H. p. osmastoni (Hartert, E, 1908) – Andaman Islands

Call of pale-footed bush warbler

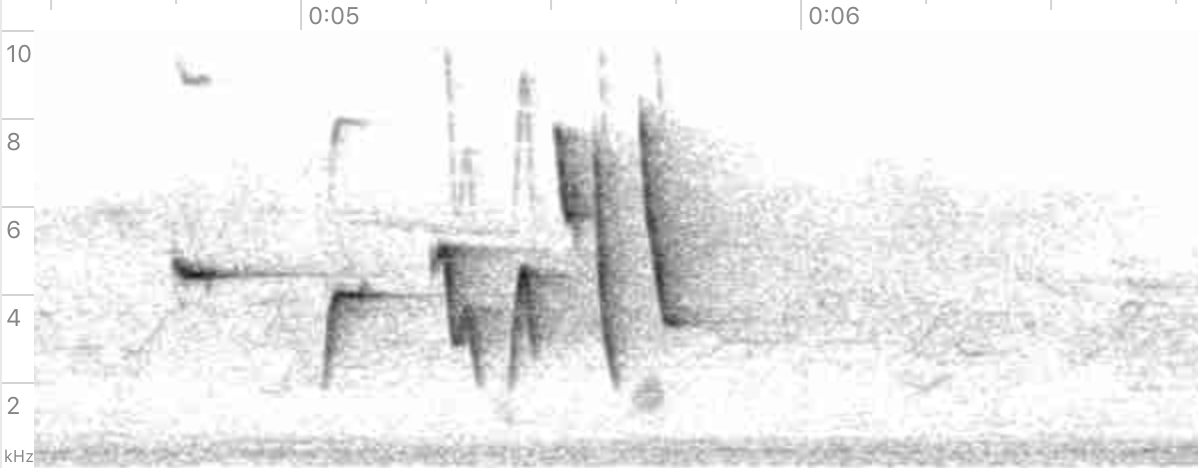
Sonogram of pale-footed bush warbler

== Distribution and habitat ==
The pale-footed bush warbler usually associates with Themeda grasslands. The habitat and altitudinal limit for pale-footed bush warbler vary slightly from place to place. For example, in Thailand, its habitat is grassland and scrub from foothills up to 1,800 m (5,900 ft). In China, it is found in woodland up to 1,525 m (5,003 ft).

=== Nepal ===
The pale-footed bush warbler is a resident bird for Nepal. It is mostly found in Chitwan. This species is threatened by habitat loss and population decline in Nepal.

=== India ===
In peninsular India the pale-footed bush warbler U. p. pallidipes has been reported as breeding in the Eastern Ghats by Salim Ali and Sidney Dillon Ripley. They collected a specimen from Sunkarametta, Araku Valley, Vishakapatnam district [altitude of 1,000 m (3,300 ft)] in the month of April. A male adult of the subspecies U. p. osmastoni was first described from Andaman Islands [altitude 730 m (2,400 ft)] by Ernst Hartert. Nest-building in U. p. osmastoni was described by Bertram Beresford Osmaston in the year 1907. Subspecies U. p. pallidipes has also been reported from Simlipal Tiger Reserve, Simlipal National Park Odisha [altitude 600–1,500 m (2,000–4,900 ft)] in December 2012 from a grassland near a Sal forest

== Behaviour ==
The pale-footed bush warbler is extremely shy and is a great skulker, meaning it is very difficult to see even during the breeding season. This species breeds from May to July. The bird is usually found either by itself or in pairs in low bushes and grass clumps. It is also known as a ground-dwelling species; thus, it flies less than a meter above ground. It moves through grass reeds keeping low, staying mostly out of sight and it feeds on the lower half of grass reeds.

=== Vocalization ===
The pale-footed bush warbler has a loud song. Because it remains near the ground, it is more easily heard than seen. This species remains mostly silent during winter but its call and song can be easily heard during spring. Its explosive song is the best way to signal the presence of its species.
