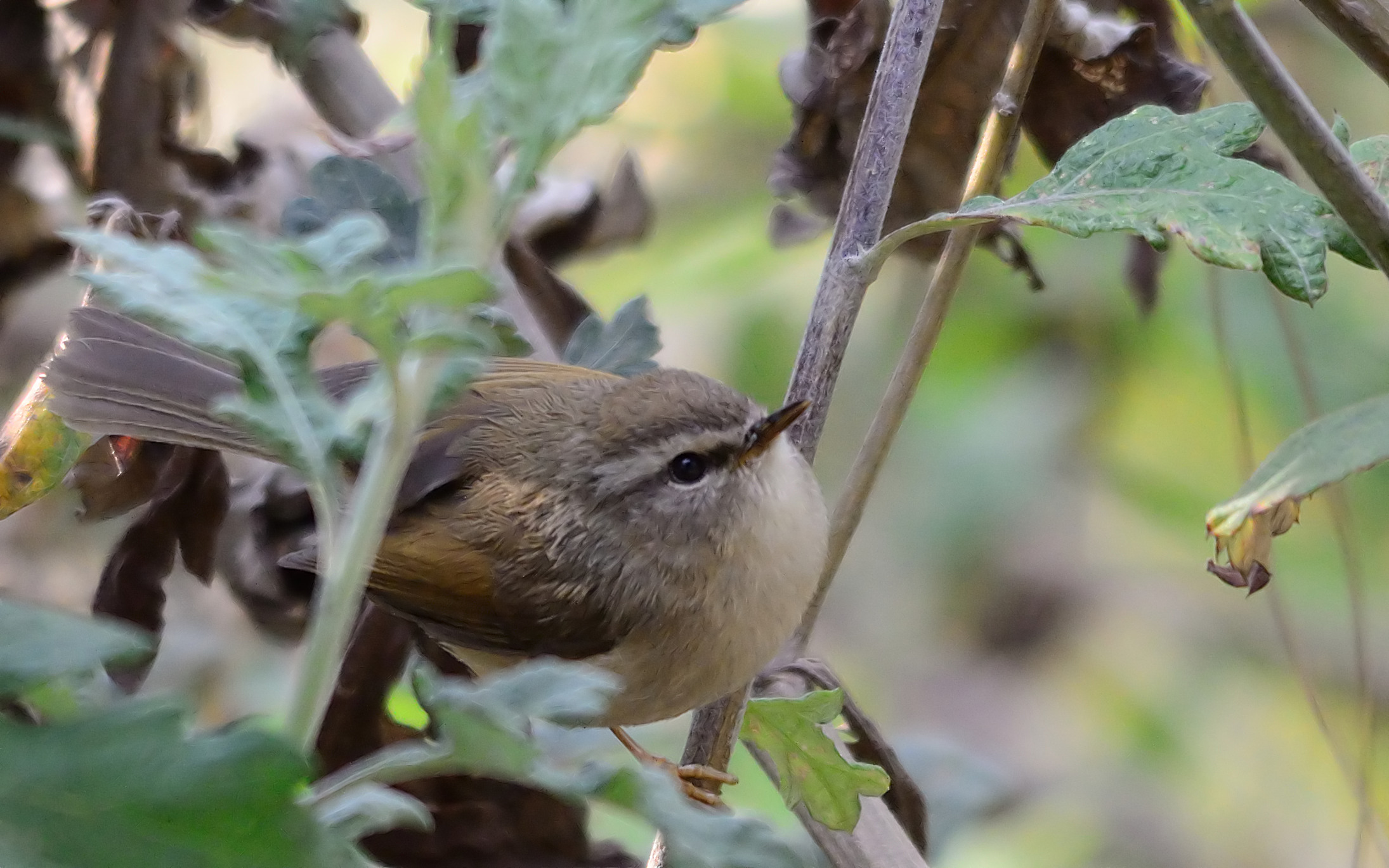
- at Walong

Conservation status
- Least Concern (IUCN 3.1)

Scientific classification
- Kingdom: Animalia
- Phylum: Chordata
- Class: Aves
- Order: Passeriformes
- Family: Cettiidae
- Genus: Horornis
- Species: H. brunnescens

Binomial name
- Horornis brunnescens (Hume, 1872)
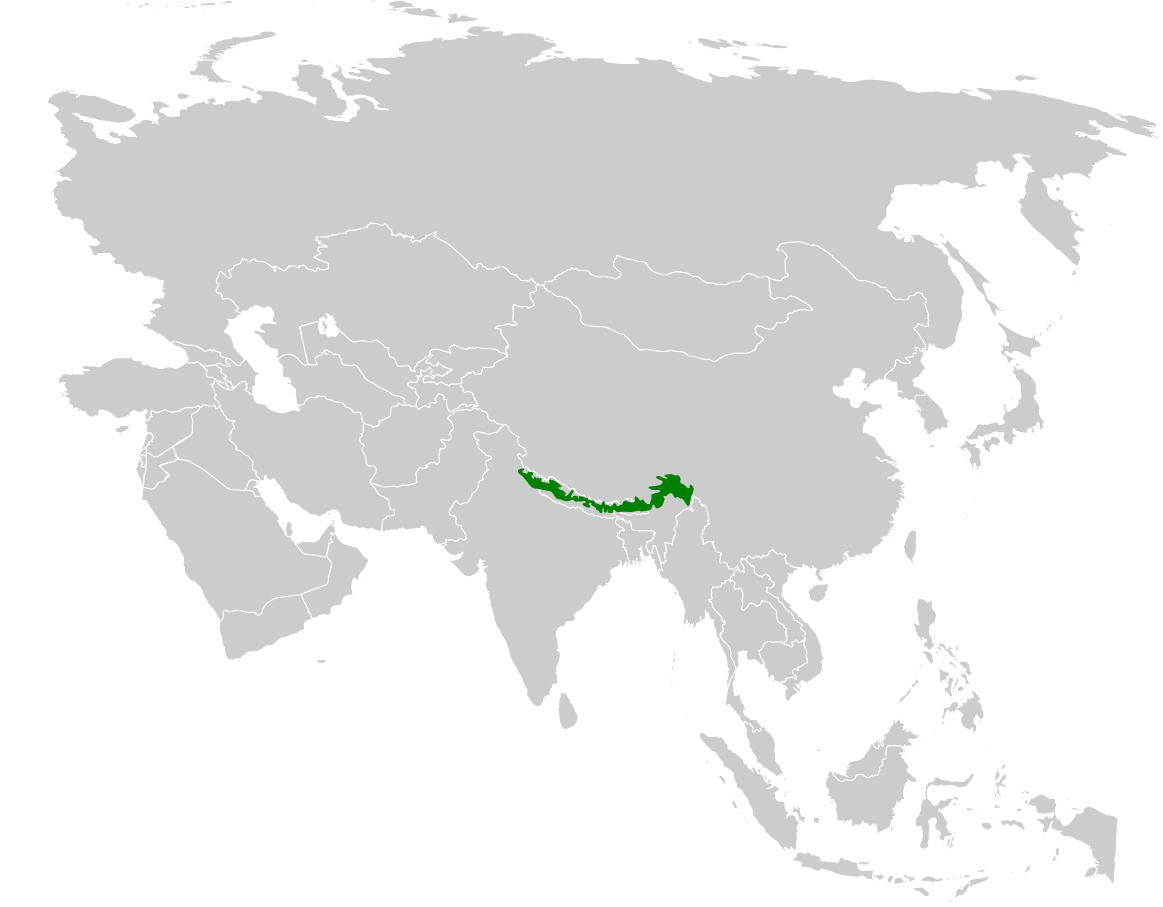

Synonyms
- Cettia brunnescens

= Hume's bush warbler =

Species of bird

Hume's bush warbler (Horornis brunnescens) is a species of bush warbler (family Cettiidae). It was formerly included in the "Old World warbler" assemblage.

It is found in the Himalayas of Nepal and India.

It was formerly considered conspecific with the yellow-bellied bush warbler.

The name commemorates the British naturalist Allan Octavian Hume who worked in India.
