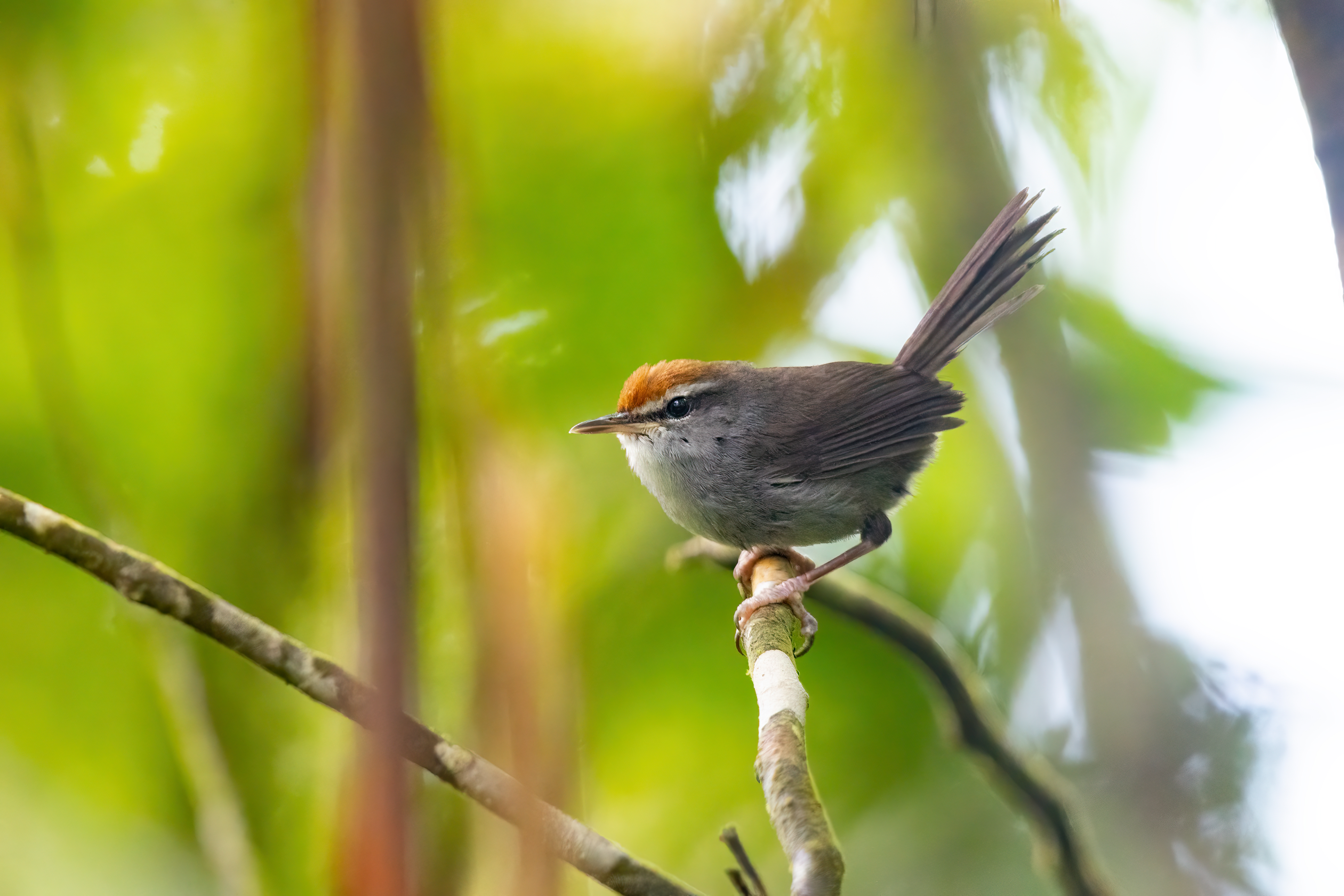

Conservation status
- Least Concern (IUCN 3.1)

Scientific classification
- Kingdom: Animalia
- Phylum: Chordata
- Class: Aves
- Order: Passeriformes
- Family: Cettiidae
- Genus: Horornis
- Species: H. ruficapilla

Binomial name
- Horornis ruficapilla (Ramsay, 1875)

Synonyms
- Vitia ruficapilla Cettia ruficapilla

= Fiji bush warbler =

Species of bird

The Fiji bush warbler (Horornis ruficapilla) is a species of bird in the family Cettiidae. It is endemic to the islands of Fiji. There are four subspecies occurring on all the main islands of the group. The species has been afforded its own genus, Vitia, in the past, but similarities of egg colour, song and morphology place it firmly within the Horornis bush-warblers.
