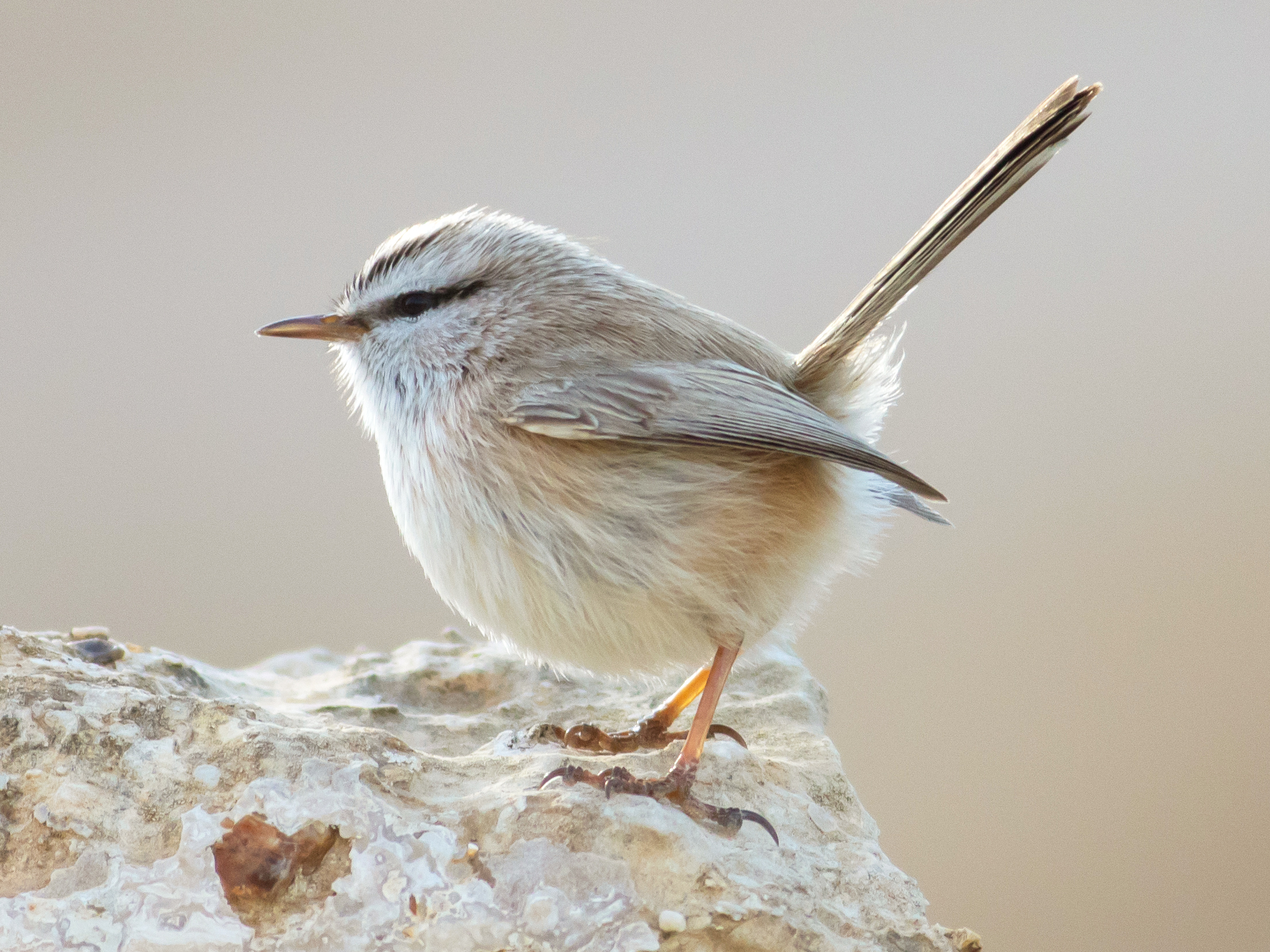
- Nominate S. i. inquieta, Sde Boker, Israel

Conservation status
- Least Concern (IUCN 3.1)

Scientific classification
- Kingdom: Animalia
- Phylum: Chordata
- Class: Aves
- Order: Passeriformes
- Family: Cettiidae
- Genus: Scotocerca; Sundevall, 1872
- Species: S. inquieta

Binomial name
- Scotocerca inquieta (Cretzschmar, 1830)

= Streaked scrub warbler =

Species of bird

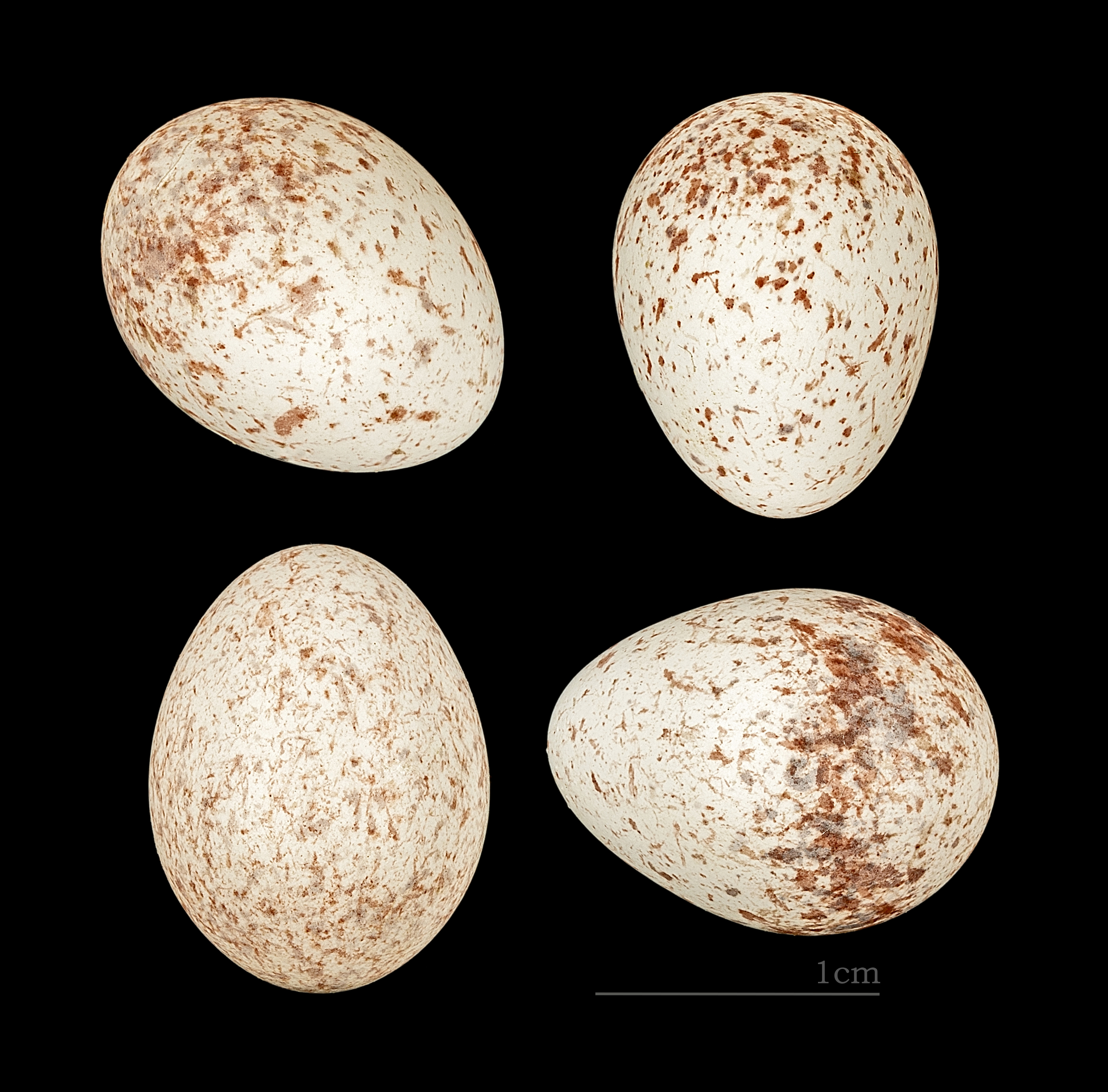
Eggs of Scotocerca inquieta saharae MHNT

The streaked scrub warbler (Scotocerca inquieta), also known simply as the scrub warbler, is a small passerine bird in the family Cettiidae. It is the only species placed in the genus Scotocerca. It is found in northern Africa and south-western Asia. It is a bird of desert fringes, frequenting scrubby areas, ravines and gorges, and is mainly resident, although local movements can occur outside the breeding season.

The genus is basal in the Cettiidae and has sometimes been separated into its own family Scotocercidae.

== Taxonomy ==
The streaked scrub warbler was formally described and illustrated in 1830 by the German physician Philipp Jakob Cretzschmar under the binomial name Malurus inquietus. This species is now the only bird placed in the genus Scotocerca that was introduced in 1872 by the Swedish zoologist Carl Jakob Sundevall with the streaked scrub warbler as the type species. The genus name Scotocerca combines the Ancient Greek skotos meaning "dark" or "darkness" (from skotoō "to darken") with kerkos meaning "tail". The specific inquieta is from Latin inquietus meaning "restless". The genus has sometimes been placed in its own family Scotocercidae that was introduced in 2012 by Silke Fregin and collaborators.

The streaked scrub warbler was formerly sometimes placed in the family Cisticolidae. David Winkler and colleagues include this species in an enlarged family Scotocercidae that includes the families Cettiidae and Erythrocercidae; an invalid treatment as Cettiidae (published in 2006) has priority over Scotocercidae (published in 2012).

Eight subspecies are recognised:

- S. i. theresae Meinertzhagen R, 1939 – Mauritania, southwest and central Morocco
- S. i. saharae (Loche, 1858) – east Morocco to Libya
- S. i. inquieta (Cretzschmar, 1830) – northeast Egypt to northwest Arabia
- S. i. grisea Bates, 1936 – west Saudi Arabia, east Yemen and Oman
- S. i. buryi Ogilvie-Grant, 1902 – south Saudi Arabia and west Yemen
- S. i. montana Stepanyan, 1970 – Iran, south Turkmenistan, south Tajikistan and Afghanistan
- S. i. platyura (Severtsov, 1873) – Kazakhstan, Uzbekistan, north Turkmenistan and southwest Tajikistan
- S. i. striata (Brooks W.E., 1872) – south-central Iraq, south Iran and Pakistan

Some authorities split the streaked scrub warbler into two species, the Saharan scrub warbler (Scotocerca saharae, including subspecies theresae) and the Levant scrub warbler (Scotocerca inquieta, including all other subspecies), an approach which has been followed in the most recent version of the Collins Bird Guide.

== Description ==
The streaked scrub warbler is a small, skulking desert warbler which cocks its tail over its back. The adults are grey brown above, finely streaked with dark brown. They have a broad pale supercilium and a thin black eyestripe. The underparts are whitish with reddish flanks and vent, the breast is finely streaked. The tail is graduated and dark brown with a white tip. Juveniles are duller. Short, fine but stout bill is mostly grey-brown with slightly paler base to lower mandible.

Can appear to have almost mouse-like behaviour, keeping in cover and moving quickly and nervously. Jumps and hops rapidly on ground, and habitually feeds around tiny shrubs and stones (occasionally skulking). Flight on whirring wings is rather weak but quite direct, usually very low and over short distances. Usually encountered in very vocal groups of pairs or family parties.

The song of the streaked scrub warbler is distinctive and is rendered as "zit-zit dweedle-doolredle-doleed"

== Distribution and habitat ==
The streaked scrub warbler is a bird of open desert with a sparse cover of scrub, especially wadi beds with a denser cover than the surrounding desert, as well as scree areas with bushes in ravines and gorges.

== Behaviour ==
=== Breeding ===
The streaked scrub warbler nests in low scrub up to 1.5m above the ground, the nest is a domed structure made of grass and twigs and lined with feathers, fur and plant down. It has 1-2 side entrances, and if there is a second it is used only as an exit. The clutch size averages 3–5 but varies from 2–5, incubation is roughly two weeks with another two weeks before the young fledge.

=== Food and feeding ===
Its main food is insects but it will also eat seeds which may be very important in winter. It forages on the ground, fossicking through leaf litter and other debris under bushes, and into cavities but will also feed up in the vegetation at times.

== Status ==
The streaked scrub warbler has a very wide range and is scarce in some places and common in others. No particular threats have been identified and the population is believed to be steady or declining slightly. The International Union for Conservation of Nature has rated its conservation status as being of "least concern".

== Gallery ==
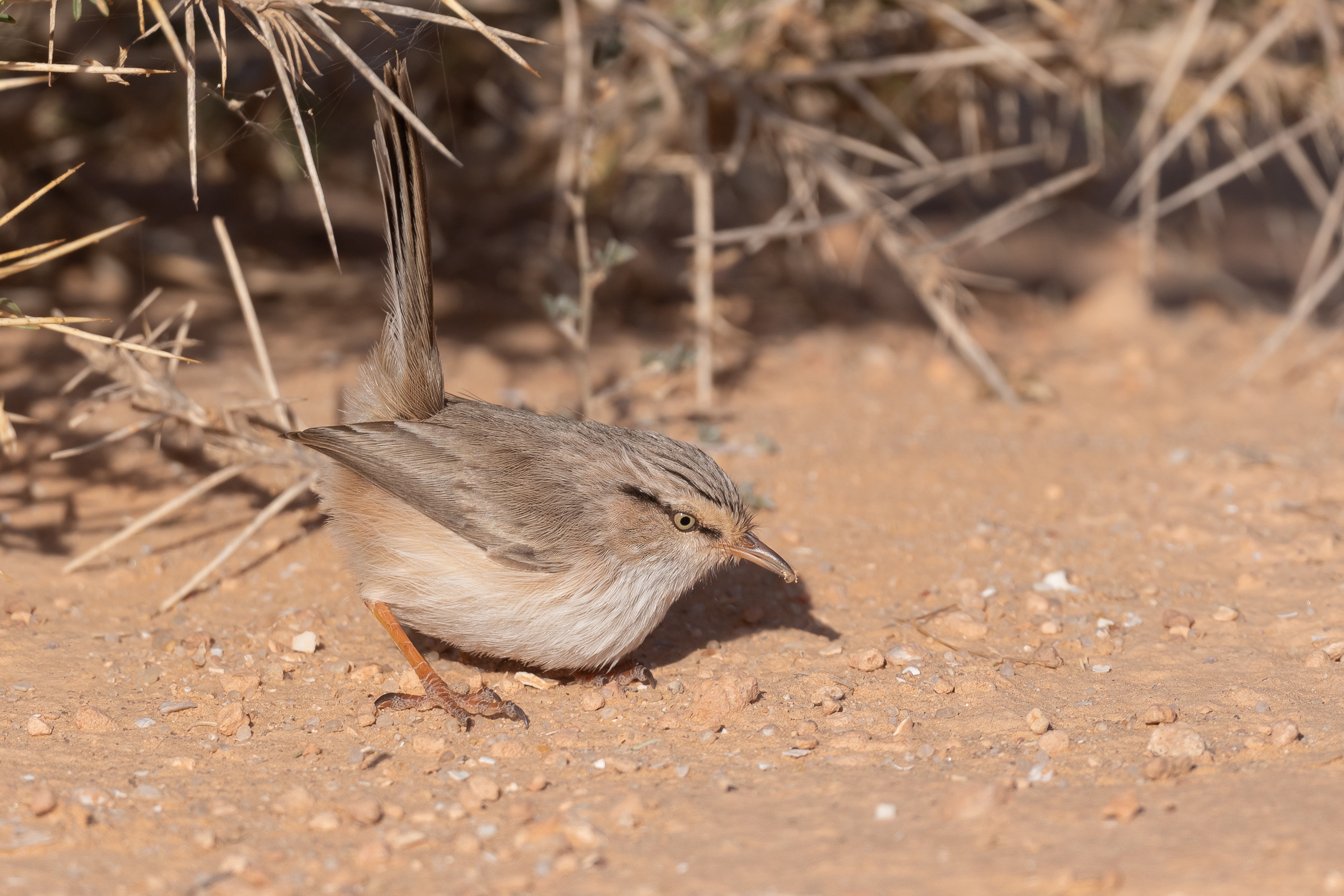
S. i. saharae, Bou-Hedma National Park, Tunisia

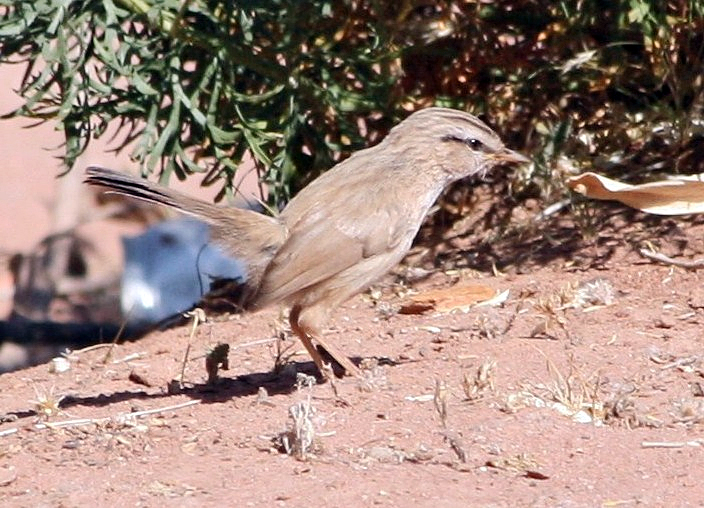
S. i. inquieta, Petra, Jordan

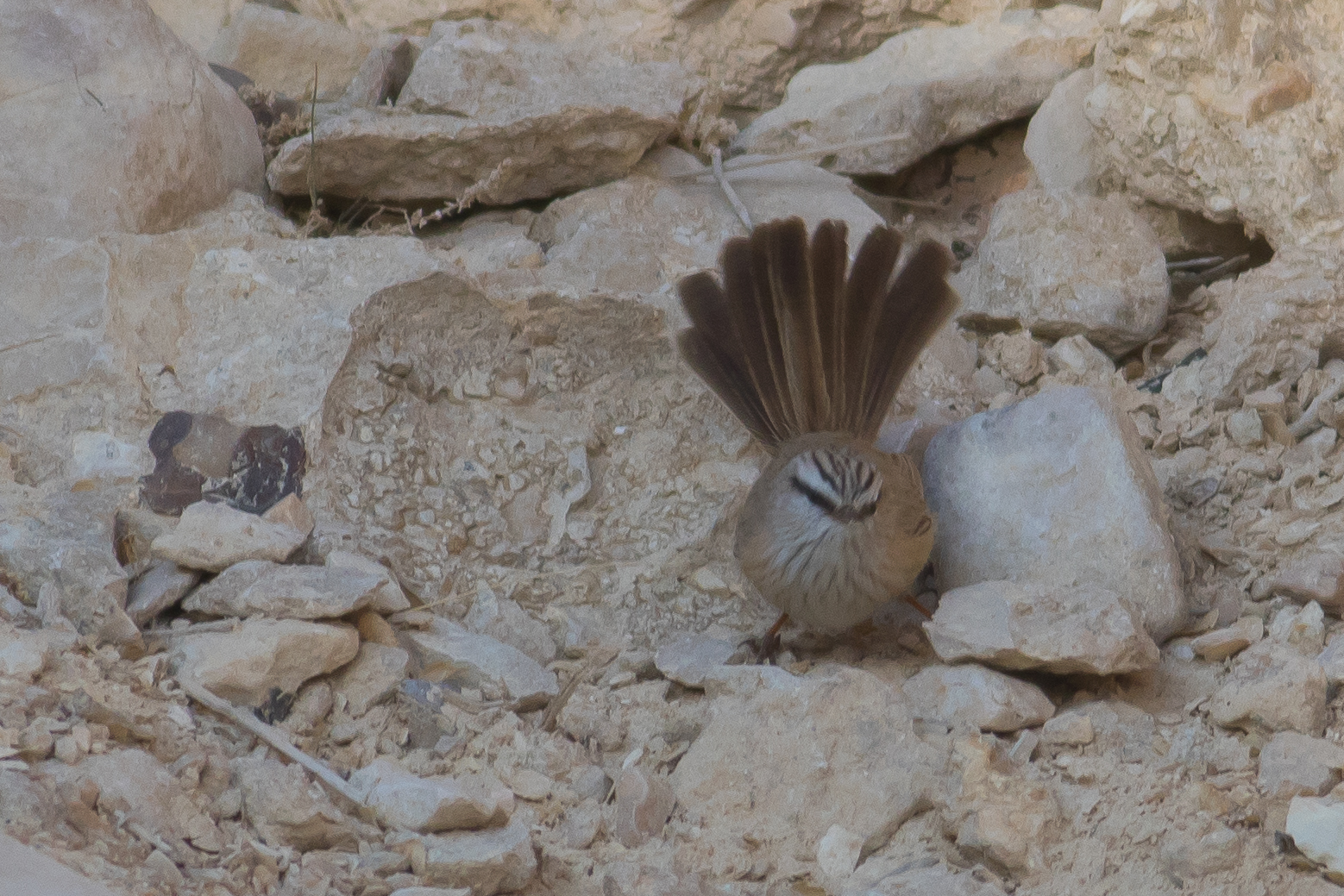
S. i. inquieta, Sde Boker, Israel
