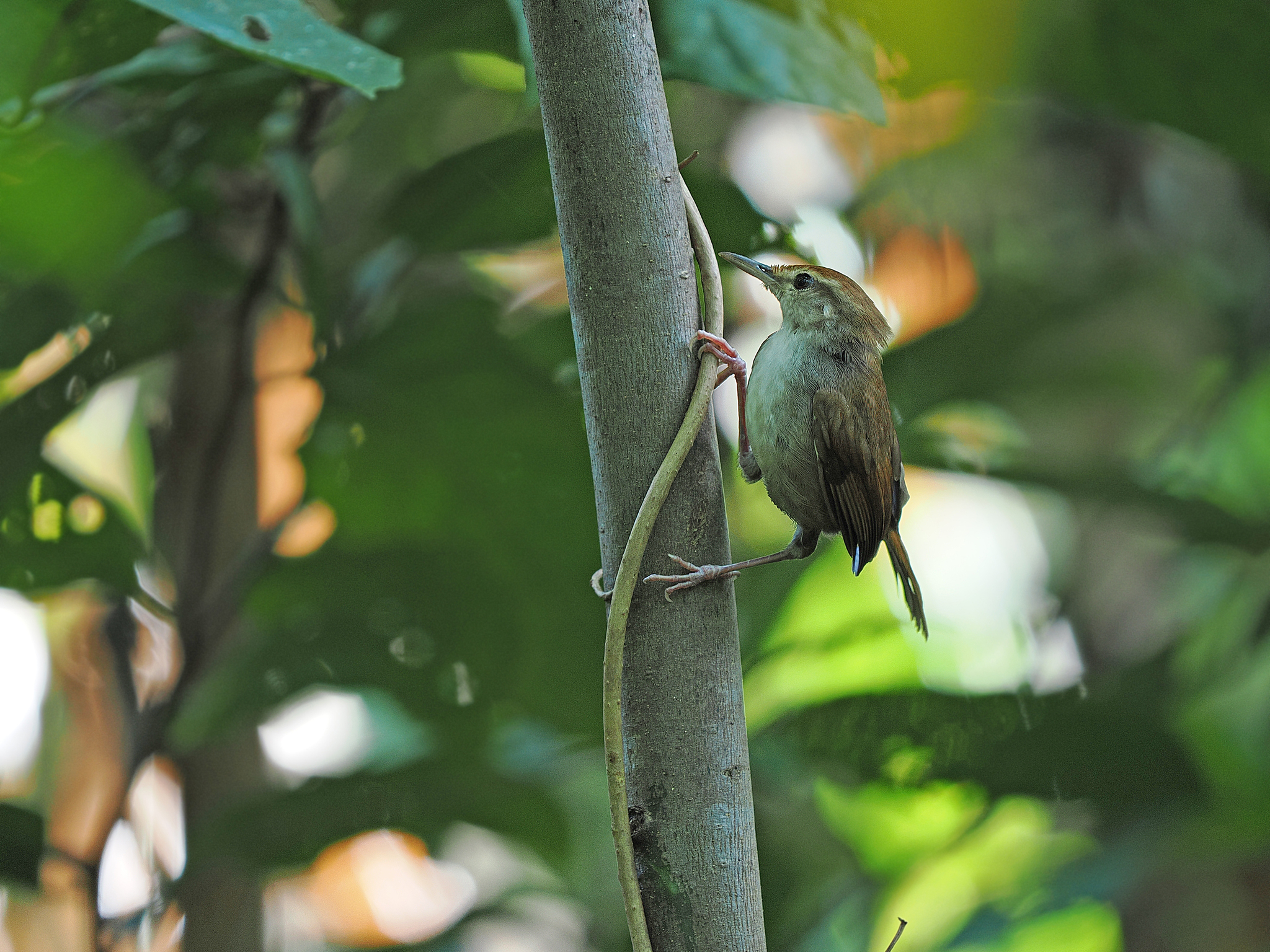

Conservation status
- Near Threatened (IUCN 3.1)

Scientific classification
- Kingdom: Animalia
- Phylum: Chordata
- Class: Aves
- Order: Passeriformes
- Family: Cettiidae
- Genus: Horornis
- Species: H. carolinae

Binomial name
- Horornis carolinae (Rozendaal, 1987)

Synonyms
- Cettia carolinae

= Tanimbar bush warbler =

Species of bird

The Tanimbar bush warbler (Horornis carolinae) is a species of bird in the family Cettiidae. It is found in Yamdena. Its natural habitat is subtropical or tropical moist lowland forest. It is threatened by habitat loss.
