= Brown-flanked bush warbler =

- At Darjeeling, West Bengal, India.

Conservation status
- Least Concern (IUCN 3.1)

Scientific classification
- Kingdom: Animalia
- Phylum: Chordata
- Class: Aves
- Order: Passeriformes
- Family: Cettiidae
- Genus: Horornis
- Species: H. fortipes

Binomial name
- Horornis fortipes Hodgson, 1845

Synonyms
- Cettia fortipes

Species of bird

The brown-flanked bush warbler (Horornis fortipes), also known as the brownish-flanked bush warbler, is a species of bush-warbler of the family Cettiidae. It was formerly included in the "Old World warbler" assemblage. It is found in Himalayas, South China and Southeast Asia.
