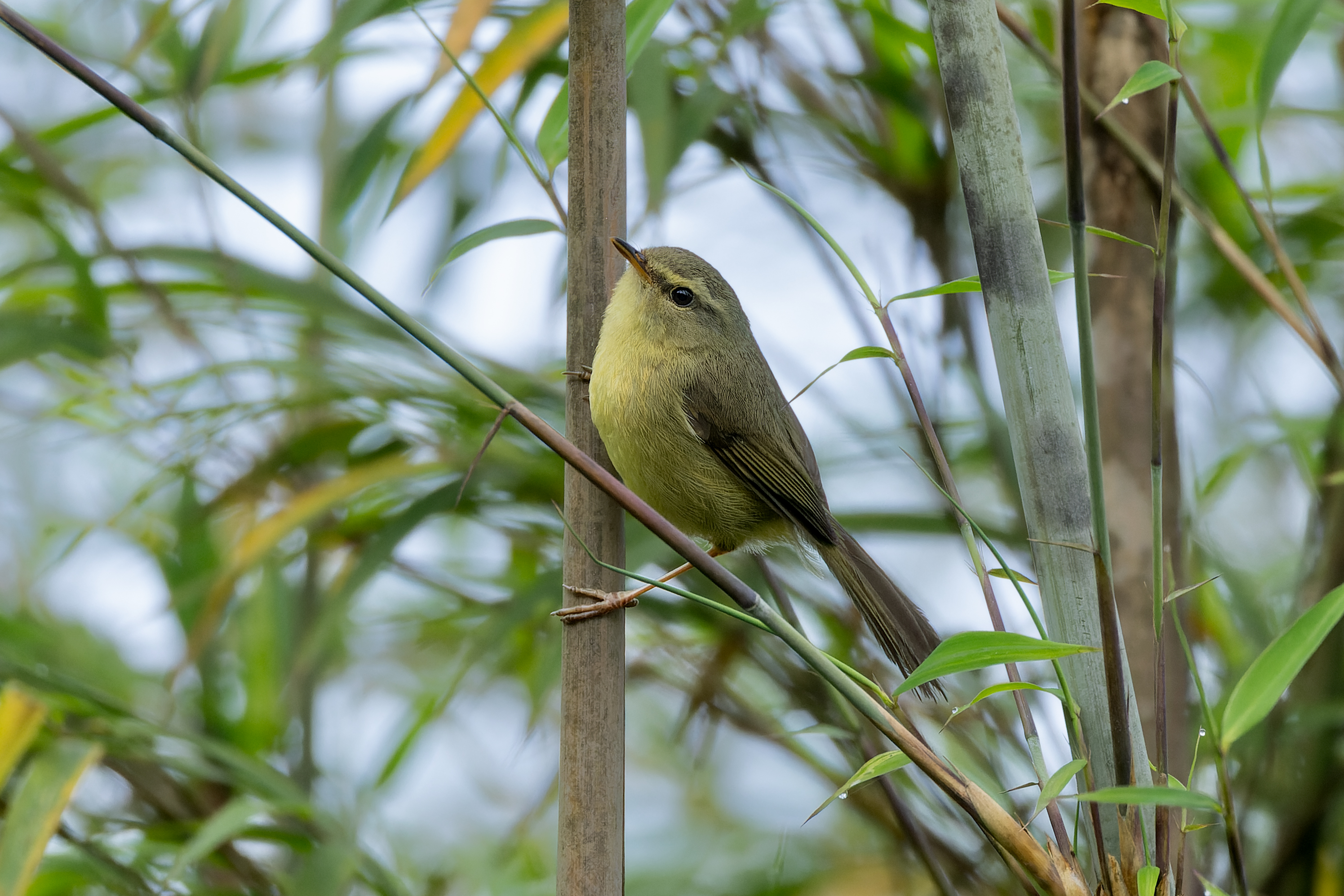
- In West Bengal, India

Conservation status
- Least Concern (IUCN 3.1)

Scientific classification
- Kingdom: Animalia
- Phylum: Chordata
- Class: Aves
- Order: Passeriformes
- Family: Cettiidae
- Genus: Horornis
- Species: H. flavolivaceus

Binomial name
- Horornis flavolivaceus (Blyth, 1845)

Synonyms
- Cettia flavolivacea; Cettia flavolivaceus

= Aberrant bush warbler =

Species of bird

The aberrant bush warbler (Horornis flavolivaceus) is a species in the bush warbler family, Cettiidae. It was formerly included in the "Old World warbler" assemblage.

It is found in central and southern China, and the northern extremes of Myanmar and Vietnam. It occurs in the countries of Bhutan, China, India, Indonesia, Laos, Malaysia, Myanmar, Nepal, Philippines, Thailand, Timor-Leste and Vietnam and also may occur in northeastern and southeastern Bangladesh.

== Taxonomy ==
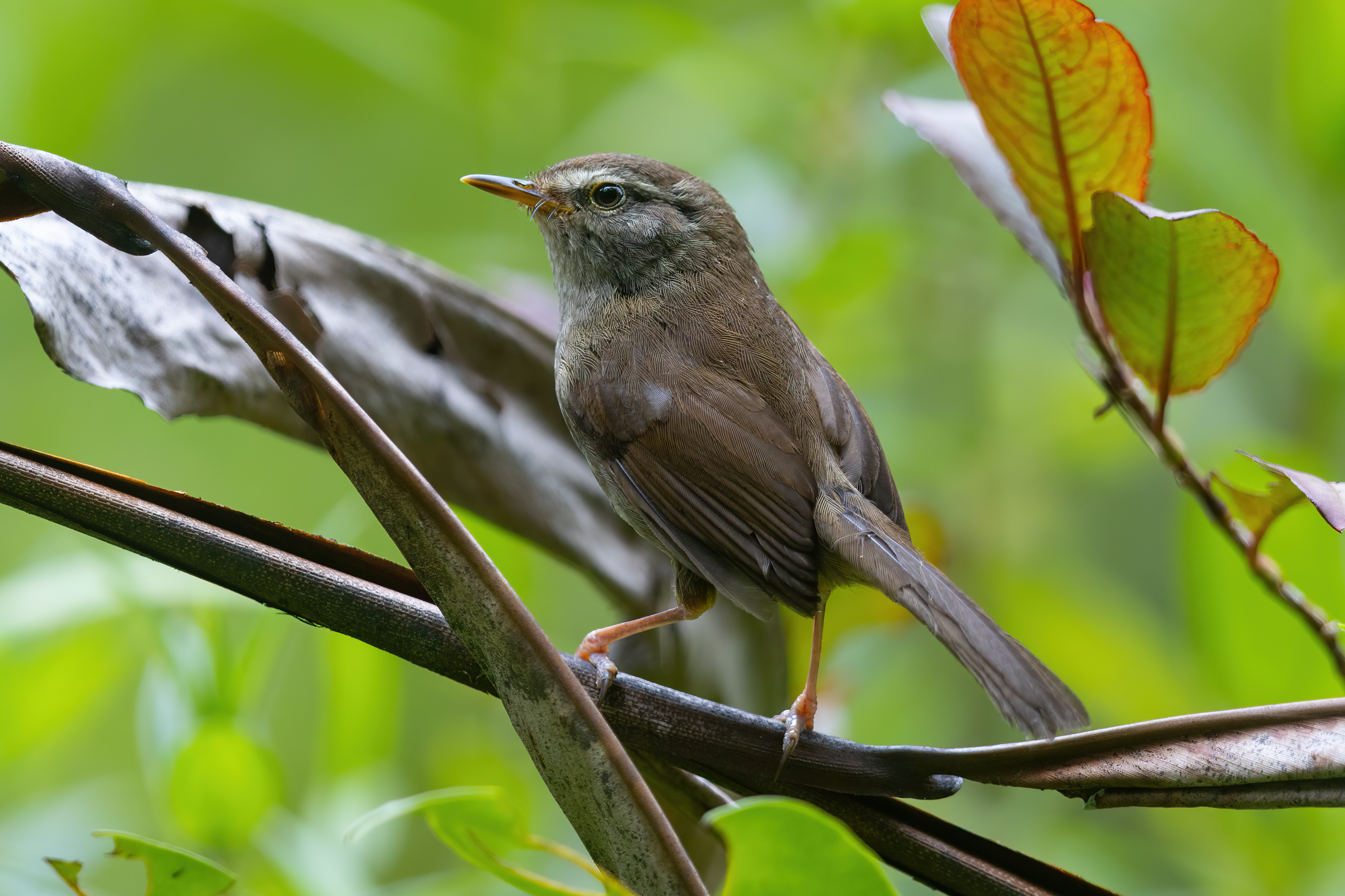
H. f. vulcanius

The aberrant bush warbler was formally described in 1845 by the English zoologist Edward Blyth based on a specimen collected in Nepal. He placed the species in the genus Neornis and coined the binomial name Neornis flavolivacea. The specific epithet flavolivaceus combines the Latin flavus meaning "yellow" with the Modern Latin olivaceus meaning "olive-green". The aberrant bush warbler is now placed in the genus Horornis that was introduced in 1845 by Brian Hodgson.

Thirteen subspecies are recognised:

- H. f. flavolivaceus (Blyth, 1845) – central, east Himalayas
- H. f. stresemanni (Koelz, 1954) – southwest Assam (northeast India)
- H. f. weberi (Mayr, 1941) – southeast Assam (northeast India) and west Myanmar
- H. f. intricatus (Hartert, EJO, 1909) – north, east Myanmar to south China
- H. f. oblitus (Mayr, 1941) – north Indochina
- H. f. sepiarius (Kloss, 1931) – montane north Sumatra
- H. f. flaviventris (Salvadori, 1879) – montane central, south Sumatra
- H. f. vulcanius (Blyth, 1870) – montane Java, Bali, Lombok and Sumbawa (west Lesser Sunda Islands)
- H. f. kolichisi (Johnstone, RE & Darnell, 1997) – montane Alor Island (east Lesser Sunda Islands)
- H. f. everetti (Hartert, EJO, 1898) – montane Timor and Wetar (east Lesser Sunda Islands)
- H. f. banksi (Chasen, 1935) – montane northwest Borneo
- H. f. oreophilus (Sharpe, 1888) – montane northeast Borneo
- H. f. palawanus (Ripley & Rabor, 1962) – montane Palawan (southwest Philippines)

The last eight subspecies in the above list have sometimes been considered as a separate species, the Sunda bush warbler Horornis vulcanius.
