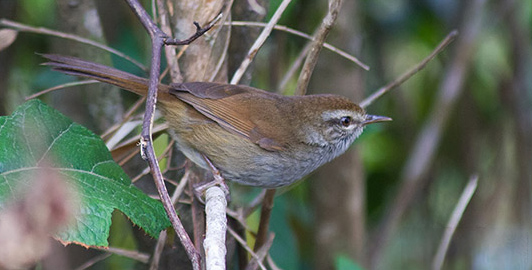

Conservation status
- Least Concern (IUCN 3.1)

Scientific classification
- Kingdom: Animalia
- Phylum: Chordata
- Class: Aves
- Order: Passeriformes
- Family: Cettiidae
- Genus: Horornis
- Species: H. seebohmi

Binomial name
- Horornis seebohmi (Ogilvie-Grant, 1894)

Synonyms
- Cettia seebohmi

= Philippine bush warbler =

Species of bird

The Philippine bush warbler (Horornis seebohmi), also known as the Luzon bush warbler, is a species of bird in the family Cettiidae. It was formerly conspecific with the Japanese bush warbler. It is found only in the Philippines in the Cordillera Mountain Range of northern Luzon. It is found in tropical montane forest.

== Description and taxonomy ==
This species was once conspecific with the Japanese bush warbler and differs vocally, through its smaller size, deeper rufous upper back, darker lores and grayer

== Ecology and behavior ==
Presumed to feed on small invertebrates. Typically seen alone foraging in low dense vegetation. This species is very vocal while remaining hidden in the thickets.

Birds in breeding condition with enlarged gonads collected in April. Juveniles have been seen from May to July but otherwise no other information on this species breeding habits.

== Habitat and conservation status ==
It is found in tropical montane pine forests above 800 meters in elevation. It is typically found in the understory and low thickets in the forest strata. Little else is known about this bird.

IUCN has assessed this bird as least-concern with the population believed to be stable but more surveys are needed to determine the actual population health and distribution of the species.
