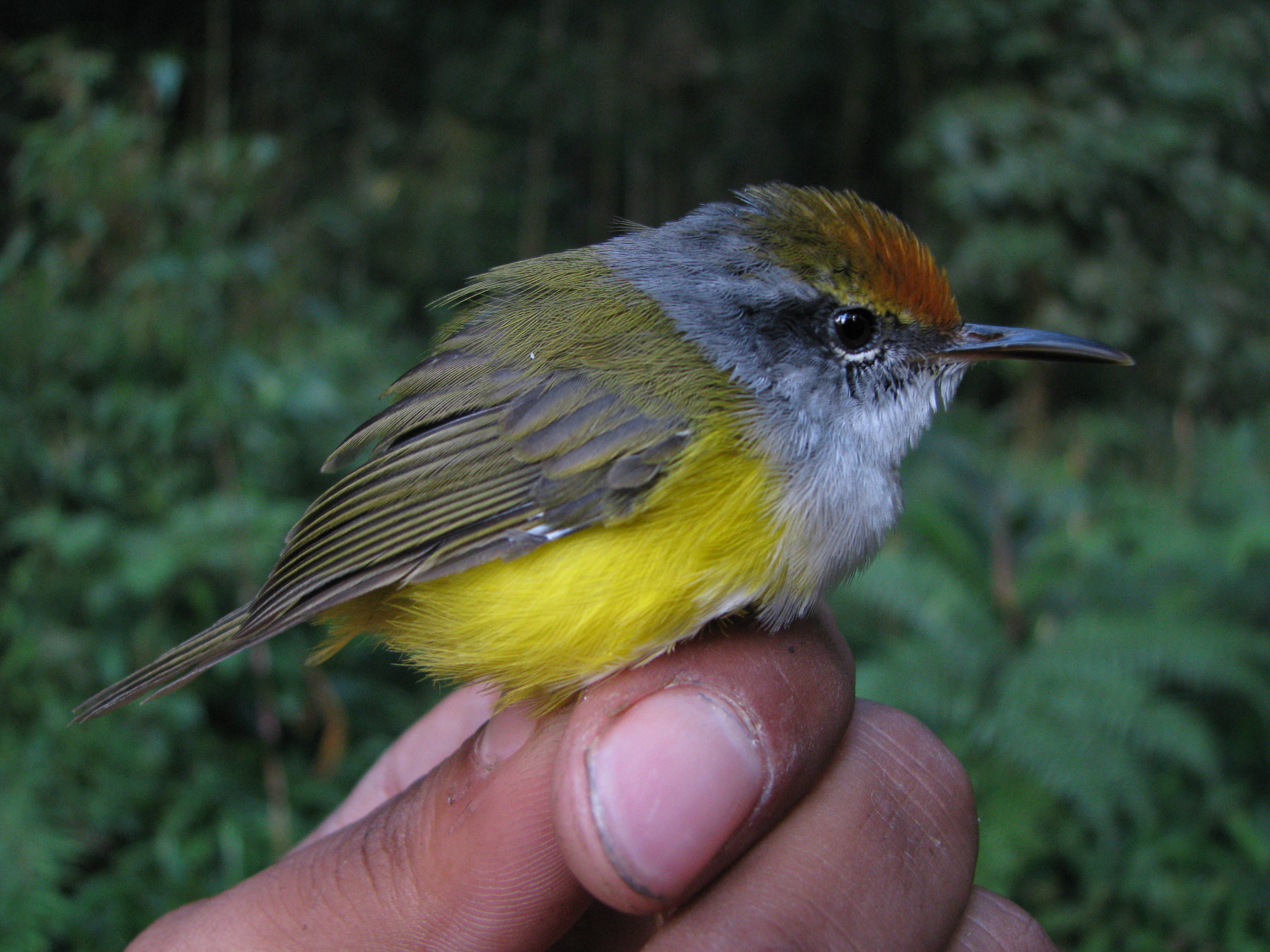
- Mountain tailorbird (Phyllergates cuculatus)

Scientific classification
- Kingdom: Animalia
- Phylum: Chordata
- Class: Aves
- Order: Passeriformes
- Family: Cettiidae
- Genus: Phyllergates; Sharpe, 1883

Type species
- Orthotomus euculatus Temminck, 1836

Species
- See text

= Phyllergates =

Genus of birds

The species of tailorbirds listed below are small birds of the genus Phyllergates . They were previously placed in the Old World warbler family Sylviidae. However, recent research suggests they more likely belong in the Cettiidae.

They occur in the Old World tropics, principally in Asia.

These warblers are usually brightly colored, with green or grey upperparts and yellow white or grey underparts. They often have chestnut on the head.

Tailorbirds have short rounded wings, short tails, strong legs and long curved bills. The tail is typically held upright, like a wren. They are typically found in open woodland, scrub and gardens.

Tailorbirds get their name from the way their nest is constructed. The edges of a large leaf are pierced and sewn together with plant fibre or spider's web to make a cradle in which the actual grass nest is built.

== Species list ==
Image	Common name	Scientific name	Distribution
	Mountain tailorbird	Phyllergates cucullatus	Bangladesh, Bhutan, Cambodia, China, India, Indonesia, Laos, Malaysia, Myanmar, the Philippines, Thailand, and Vietnam.
	Rufous-headed tailorbird	Phyllergates heterolaemus	Philippines.

== Bibliography ==
- The New Student's Reference Work/Tailor-Bird
- Ryan, Peter (2006). Family Cisticolidae (Cisticolas and allies). Pp. 378–492 in del Hoyo J., Elliott A. & Christie D.A. (2006) Handbook of the Birds of the World. Volume 11. Old World Flycatchers to Old World Warblers Lynx Edicions, Barcelona ISBN 978-84-96553-06-4
