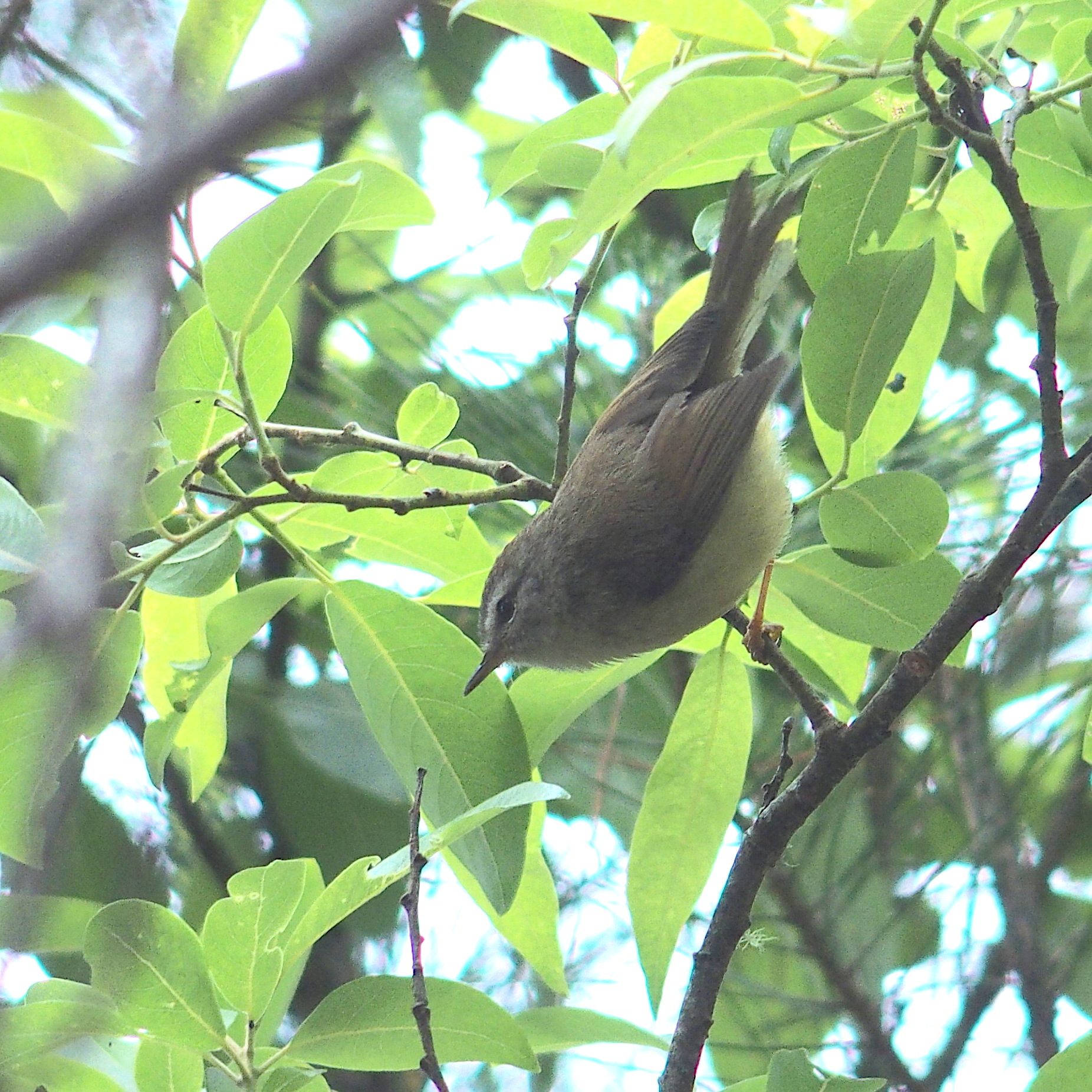

Conservation status
- Least Concern (IUCN 3.1)

Scientific classification
- Kingdom: Animalia
- Phylum: Chordata
- Class: Aves
- Order: Passeriformes
- Family: Cettiidae
- Genus: Horornis
- Species: H. acanthizoides

Binomial name
- Horornis acanthizoides (Verreaux, 1871)

Synonyms
- Cettia acanthizoides

= Yellow-bellied bush warbler =

Yellowish-bellied bush-warbler

Species of bird

The yellow-bellied bush warbler (Horornis acanthizoides), also known as the yellowish-bellied bush warbler, is a species of bush warbler in the family Cettiidae. It was formerly included in the "Old World warbler" assemblage.

It is found on mainland China and Taiwan. Hume's bush warbler was formerly considered conspecific.
