= Shade bush warbler =

Conservation status
- Least Concern (IUCN 3.1)

Scientific classification
- Kingdom: Animalia
- Phylum: Chordata
- Class: Aves
- Order: Passeriformes
- Family: Cettiidae
- Genus: Horornis
- Species: H. parens

Binomial name
- Horornis parens (Mayr, 1935)

Synonyms
- Cettia parens

Species of bird

The shade bush warbler or shade warbler (Horornis parens) is a species of bird in the family Cettiidae. It is found only in Solomon Islands, where it is endemic to the island of Makira (formerly San Cristobal Island). Its natural habitats are tropical moist lowland forests and tropical moist montane forests above 600m. It feeds on insects in the undergrowth and on the ground. It has short wings and tail with long yellow-brown legs and slender bill. Its back and crown are dark brown with a dull cinnamon coloured chest and throat. The males and females are similar, although the female is smaller at 14g compared to the heavier male at 18-19g, and may have a browner throat and less warm brown forecrown. The juvenile has a bright olive-yellow chin and throat, greyish front, olive-brown upperparts and a dark crown.
