= Teslya =

Teslya or Teslia is a Ukrainian-language surname literally meaning the occupation of "carpenter", "cabinetmaker", "joiner" Notable people with this surname include:

- Sergey Teslya
- Viktor Teslia

== See also ==
- Tesla (surname)
