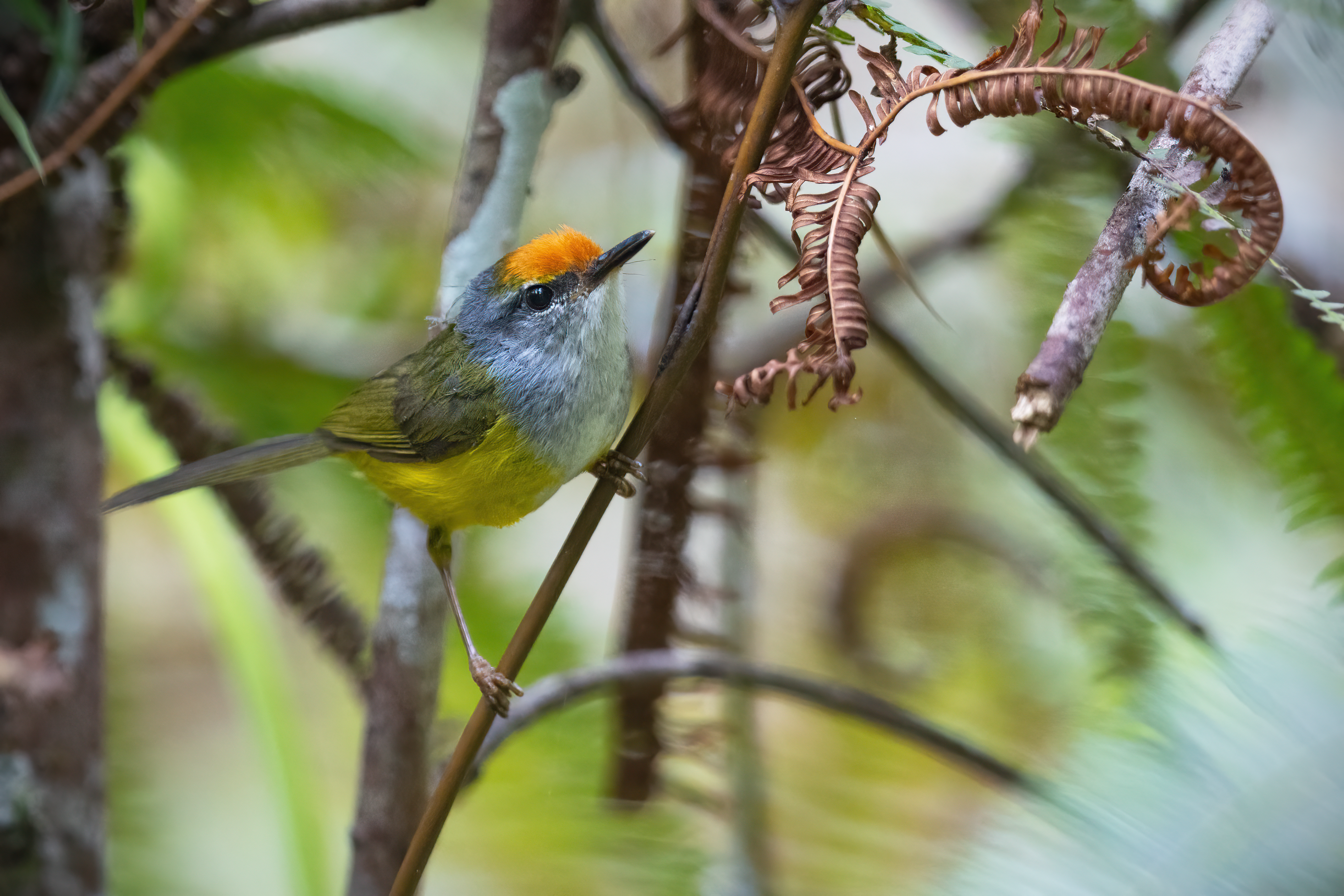

Conservation status
- Least Concern (IUCN 3.1)

Scientific classification
- Kingdom: Animalia
- Phylum: Chordata
- Class: Aves
- Order: Passeriformes
- Family: Cettiidae
- Genus: Phyllergates
- Species: P. cucullatus

Binomial name
- Phyllergates cucullatus (Temminck, 1836)
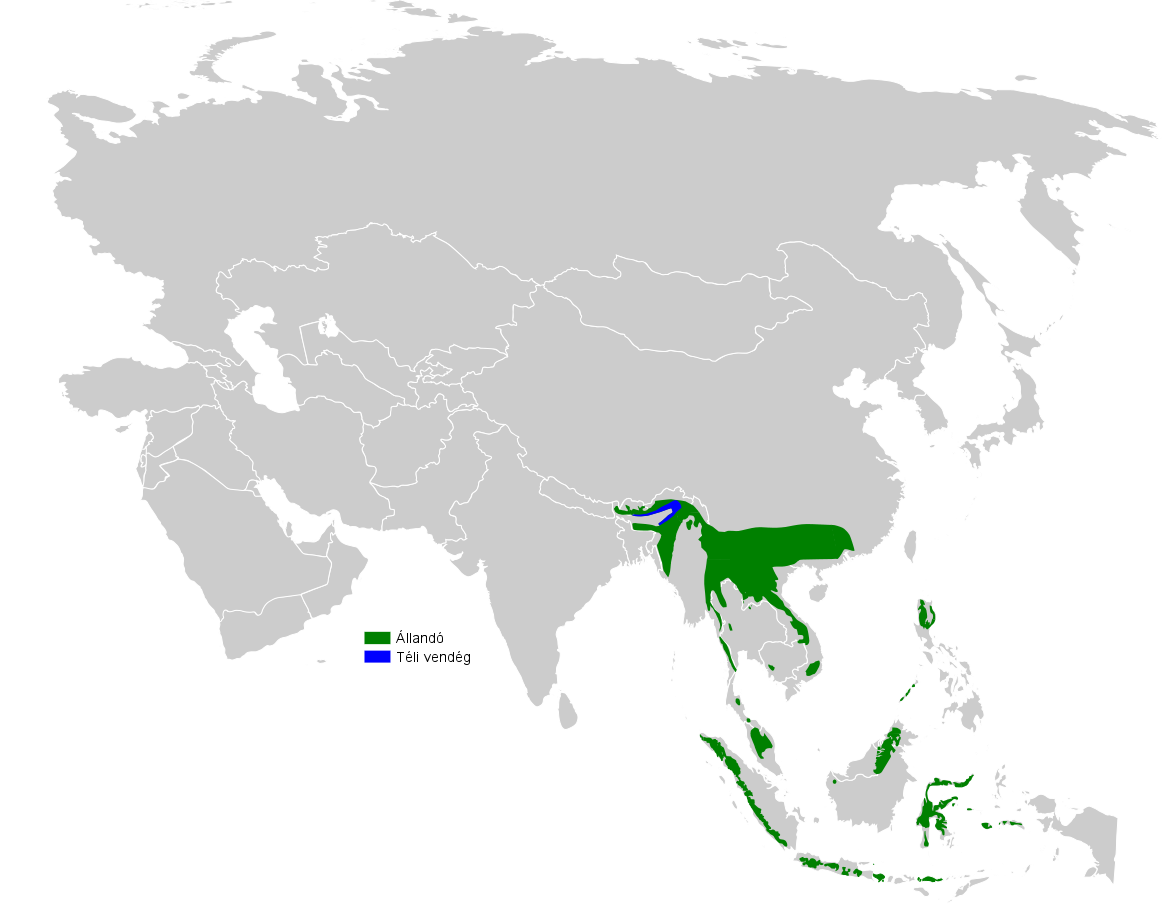

Synonyms
- Orthotomus cuculatus

= Mountain tailorbird =

Species of bird

The mountain tailorbird (Phyllergates cucullatus) is a songbird species formerly placed in the "Old World warbler" assemblage, but is now placed in the genus Phyllergates of the family Cettiidae.

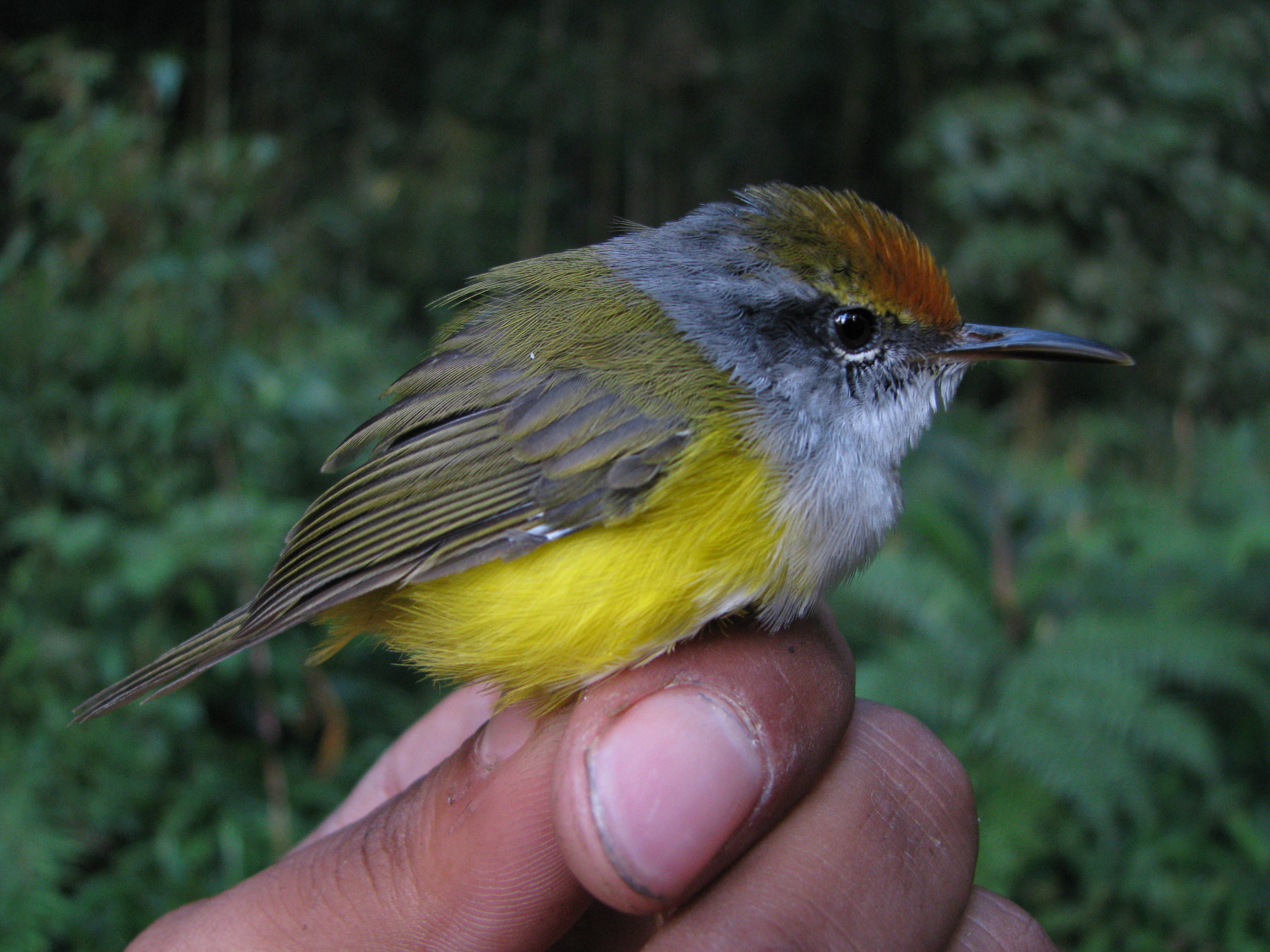
A close-up image from Arunachal Pradesh, India

It is native to the Purvanchal Range, southern China and mountainous areas of Southeast Asia.

Its natural habitats are subtropical or tropical moist lowland forest and subtropical or tropical moist montane forest.
