= Sergey Teslya =

Russian violinist

Sergey Teslya is a Russian violinist, born in Novosibirsk.

A former member of Vladimir Spivakov's chamber orchestra Moscow Virtuosi, Teslya settled in Spain in 1990. He has held the concertmaster chair at the Real Orquesta Sinfónica de Sevilla (1994–2002) -for which he created a chamber orchestra- and the Orquesta Nacional de España (2002– ), and has performed as a soloist in several Spanish concert halls.
