= Warbler =

Index of animals with the same common name

A garden warbler (Sylviidae), giving its prolonged warbling song

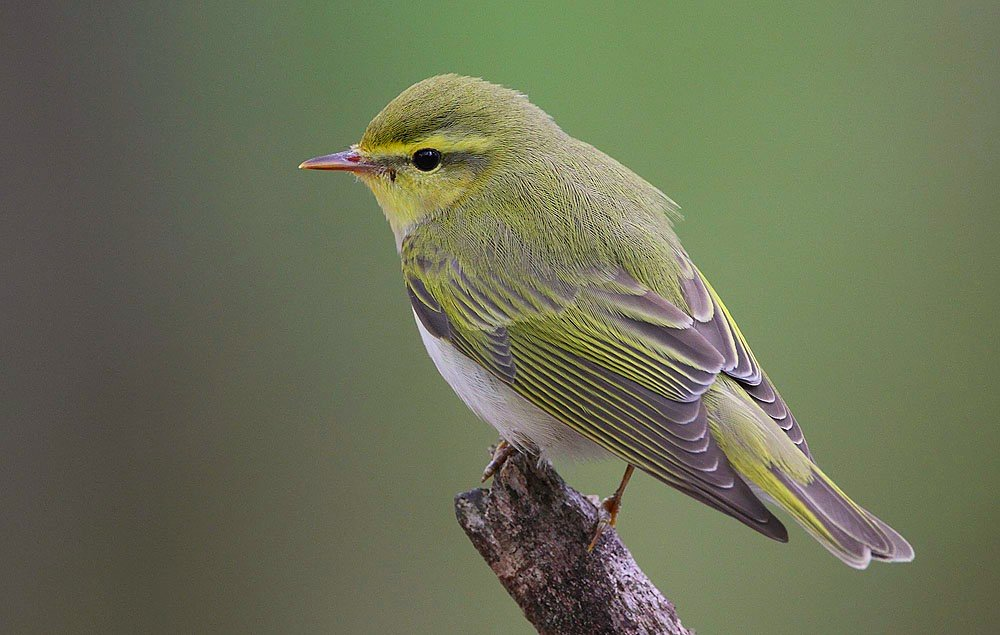
A wood warbler (Phylloscopidae)

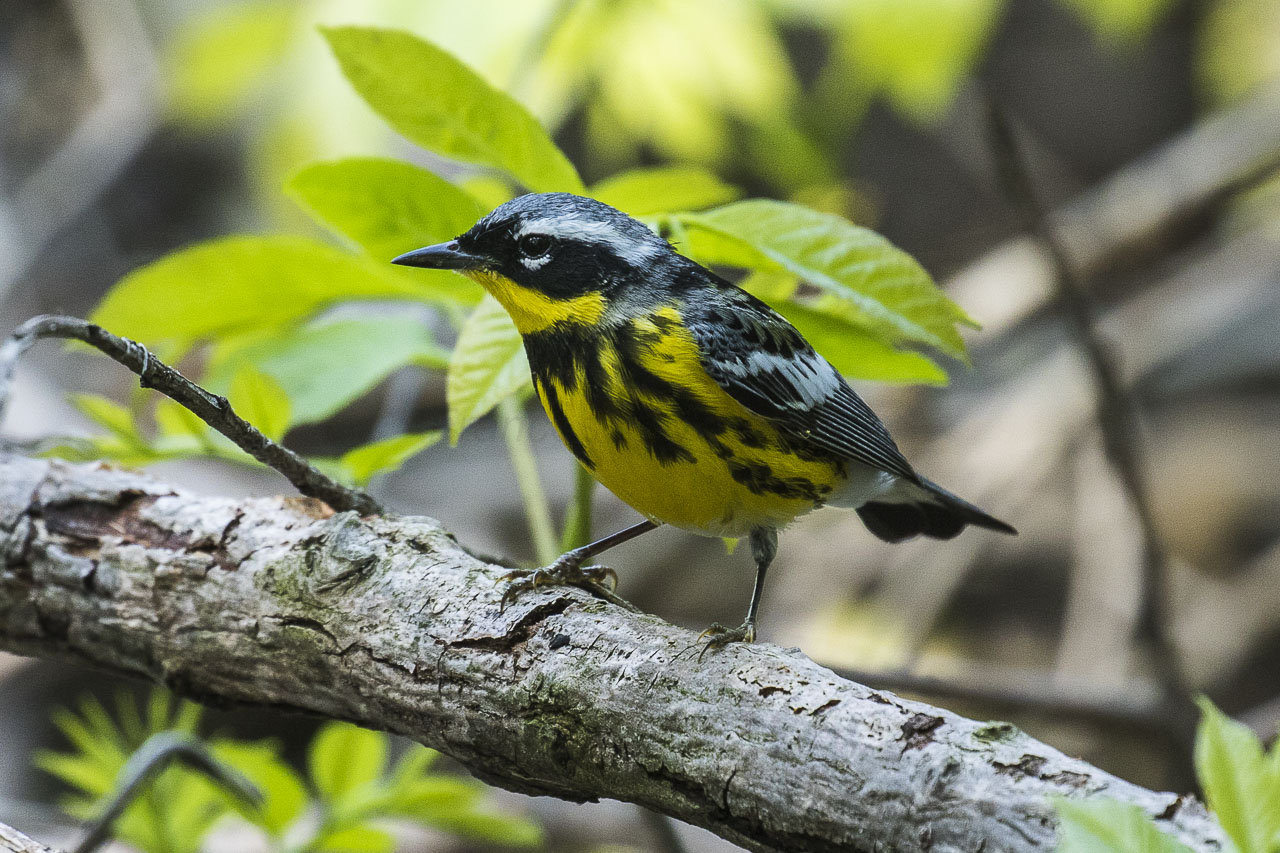
A magnolia warbler (Parulidae)

Various Passeriformes (perching birds) are commonly referred to as warblers. They are not necessarily closely related to one another, but share some characteristics, such as being fairly small, vocal, and insectivorous.

== Sylvioid warblers ==
These are somewhat more closely related to each other than to other warblers. They belong to a superfamily also containing Old World babblers, bulbuls, etc.

- "Old World warblers", formerly all in the family Sylviidae:
  - Leaf warblers, now in the family Phylloscopidae
  - Bush warblers, now in the family Cettiidae
  - Grass warblers and megalurid warblers, now in the family Locustellidae
  - Marsh and tree warblers, now in the family Acrocephalidae
  - Sylviid warblers or typical warblers, remaining in the family Sylviidae
  - Cisticolid warblers, now in the family Cisticolidae
  - Malagasy warblers, now in the family Bernieridae

== Passeroid warblers ==
The two families of American warblers are part of another superfamily, which unites them with New World sparrows, buntings, finches, etc.

- "New World warblers", formerly all in the family Parulidae:
  - Olive warbler, in the monotypic family Peucedramidae
  - New World warblers, remaining in the family Parulidae

== Others ==
- Tit-warblers or flycatcher-tits, family Stenostiridae

These are closely related to the tits and chickadees

- Australasian warblers, family Acanthizidae

These are the most distinct group of warblers. They are not closely related at all to the others, but rather to the honeyeaters and fairy-wrens.

== Sources ==
- Wilson, Edward O. (1975). Life on Earth (3. Dr ed.). Sunderland: Sinauer Associates, Inc. ISBN 978-0-87893-934-3.
