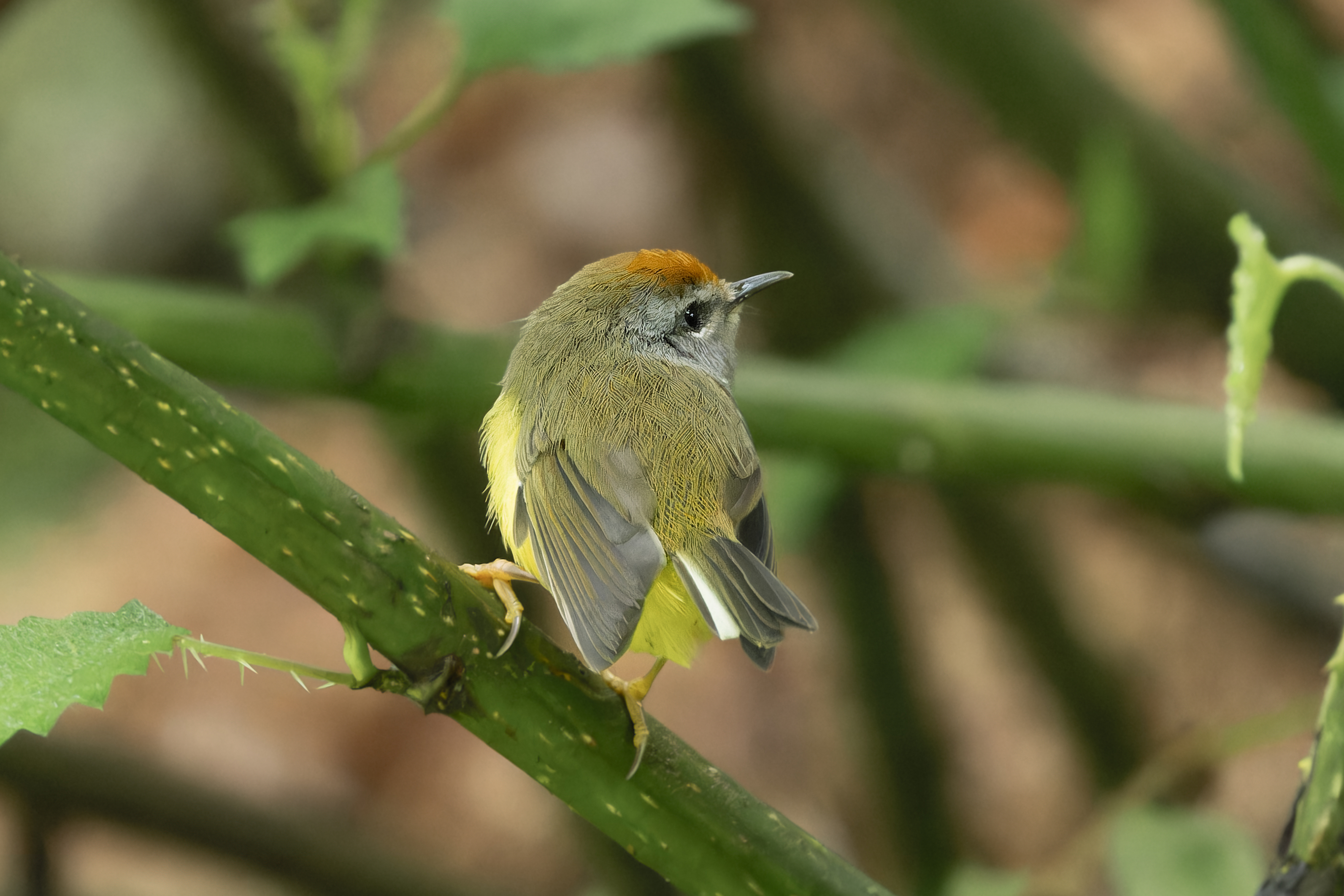
- Broad-billed Warbler (Tickellia hodgsoni) in Lepcha Jagat, West Bengal, India.

Conservation status
- Least Concern (IUCN 3.1)

Scientific classification
- Kingdom: Animalia
- Phylum: Chordata
- Class: Aves
- Order: Passeriformes
- Family: Cettiidae
- Genus: Tickellia; Blyth, 1861
- Species: T. hodgsoni

Binomial name
- Tickellia hodgsoni (Moore, F, 1854)

= Broad-billed warbler =

Species of bird

The broad-billed warbler (Tickellia hodgsoni) is a species of bush warbler (family Cettiidae). It was formerly included in the "Old World warbler" assemblage, and belongs to the monotypic genus Tickellia.

It is found in Bhutan, China, India, Laos, Myanmar, Nepal, and Vietnam. Its natural habitats are subtropical or tropical moist lowland forest and subtropical or tropical moist montane forest.

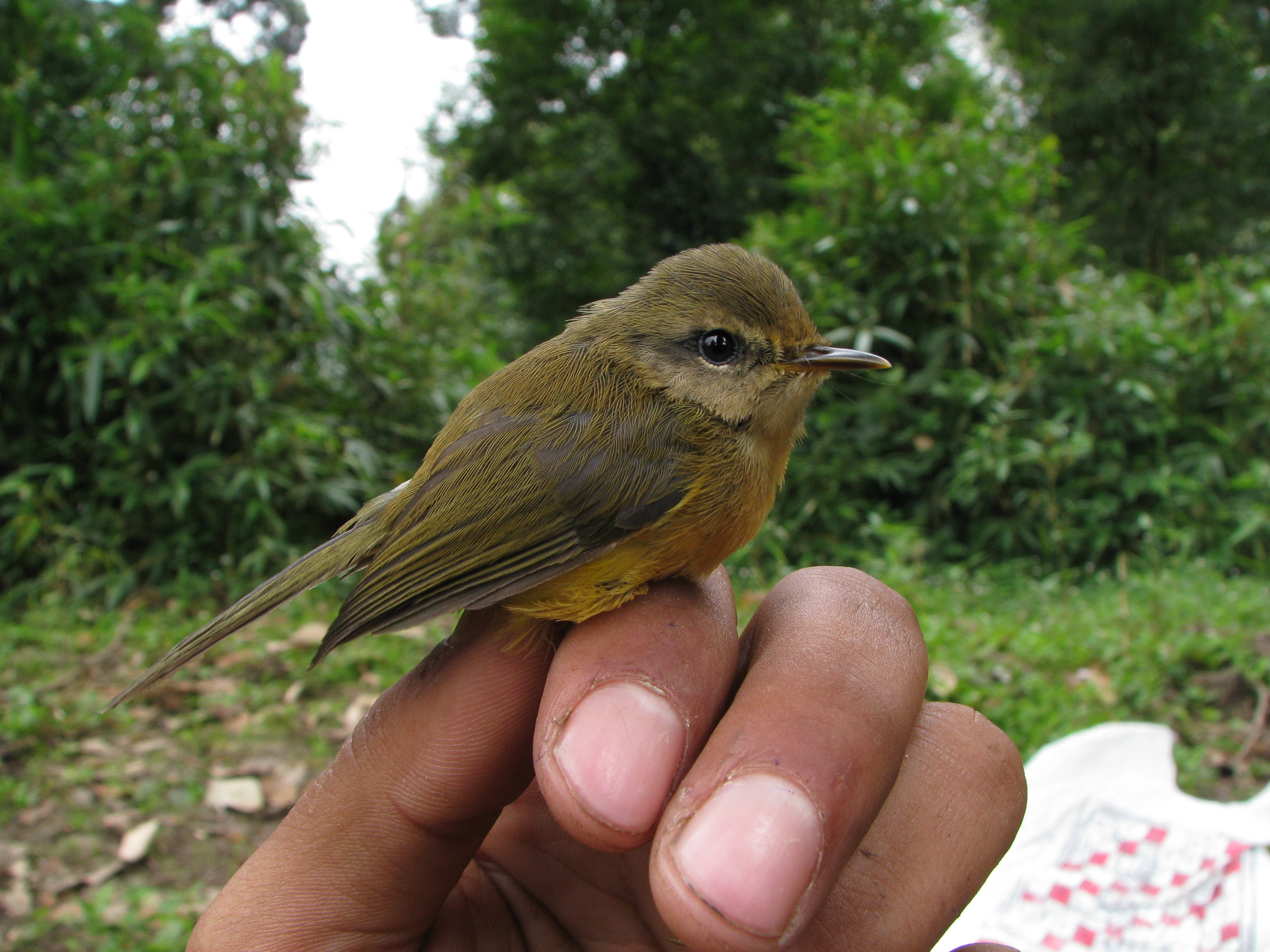
A juvenile. Note the dullness of color
