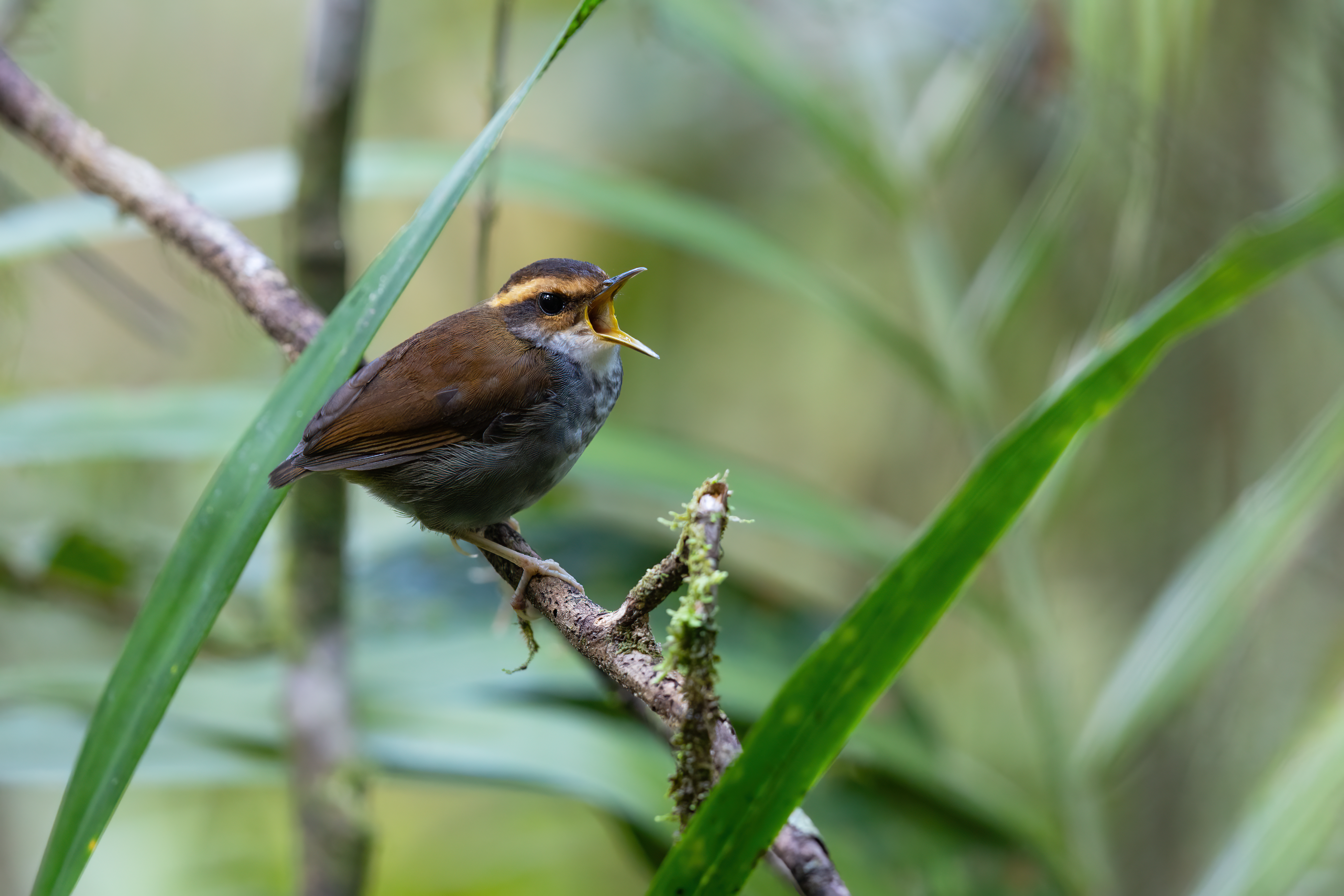

Conservation status
- Least Concern (IUCN 3.1)

Scientific classification
- Kingdom: Animalia
- Phylum: Chordata
- Class: Aves
- Order: Passeriformes
- Family: Cettiidae
- Genus: Urosphena
- Species: U. whiteheadi

Binomial name
- Urosphena whiteheadi (Sharpe, 1888)

Synonyms
- Orthnocichla whiteheadi Sharpe, 1888; Tesia whiteheadi (Sharpe, 1888); Cettia whiteheadi (Sharpe, 1888)

= Bornean stubtail =

Species of bird

The Bornean stubtail (Urosphena whiteheadi) is a species of bird in the cettiid warbler family Cettiidae. It is endemic to the island of Borneo, where it inhabits forest floors and undergrowth in montane forests at elevations of 750–3,150 m (2,460–10,330 ft). It is a small, short-tailed warbler, measuring 9.5–10 cm (3.7–3.9 in) in length and having an average mass of 10.4 g (0.37 oz). The tops of the head and the upperparts are brown, with whitish underparts that turn grey at the sides of the breast and the flanks. The supercilium (stripe above the eye) is long and buffish-brown, with an equally long dark grey eyestripe (stripe through the eye) and a thin yellow eye-ring. Both sexes are similar.

The species feeds on invertebrates, especially green aphids, foraging in a mouse-like manner on the ground and in undergrowth. Nests are made out of reddish plant fibres, with incubation taking 24 days on average. It is classified as being of least concern by the International Union for Conservation of Nature due to its sufficiently large range and stable population.

== Taxonomy and systematics ==
The Bornean stubtail was described as Orthnocichla whiteheadi by the British ornithologist Richard Bowdler Sharpe in 1888 on the basis of specimens from Mount Kinabalu, Borneo. It was later moved to the genus Tesia. In 1942, the American ornithologist Jean Delacour moved the species into the subgenus Urosphena within the genus Cettia. The American ornithologist Ben King raised Urosphena to the status of a genus in 1989.

The name of the genus, Urosphena, means wedge-tailed and is derived from the Ancient Greek words oura (tail) and sphēnos (wedge). The specific name whiteheadi refers to John Whitehead, a British explorer who collected the specimens based on which this species was described. Bornean stubtail is the official common name designated by the International Ornithologists' Union (IOU). Other common names for the species are short-tailed bush warbler, short-tailed stubtail, and Whitehead's stubtail.

The Bornean stubtail is classified by the IOU as one of 32 species in the cettiid warbler family Cettiidae. However, some authorities classify Cettiidae as a subfamily in an expanded Scotocercidae. Within the family, it is currently placed in Urosphena, a genus of three species of undistinguished brownish birds with short tails. A 2011 study of mitochondrial and nuclear DNA found that within the family, the present species is most closely related to the Asian and Timor stubtails. These species are sister (most closely related) to a clade (group of organisms descending from a common ancestor) formed by the pale-footed bush warbler and Neumann's warbler. The following cladogram shows relationships within the genus according to the study: (Note: The study did not include samples of the Timor stubtail. However, the authors hypothesised that it was most closely related to the Asian and Bornean stubtails due to similarities in appearance and vocalisations.)

- - Urosphena
    - Asian stubtail (Urosphena squameiceps)
    - Bornean stubtail (Urosphena whiteheadi)
  - Hemitesia
    - Pale-footed bush warbler (Hemitesia pallidipes)
    - Neumann's warbler (Hemitesia neumanni)

== Description ==
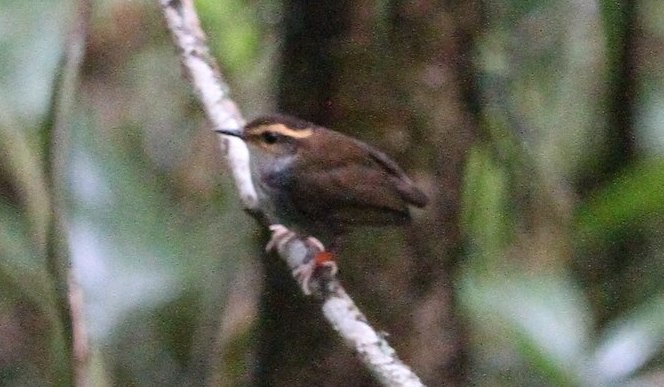
A Bornean stubtail in Kinabalu Park

The Bornean stubtail is a very small warbler with long legs and a very short tail, measuring 9.5–10 cm (3.7–3.9 in) in length and having an average mass of 10.4 g (0.37 oz). The top of the head and the upperparts are brown, while the underparts are greyish-white, turning grey at the side of the breast and the flanks. The belly is often light yellow-brown. The supercilium (stripe above the eye) is long and buffish-brown, with an equally long dark grey eyestripe (stripe through the eye) and a thin yellow eye-ring. The cheeks and ear-coverts are orange-buff. The legs are pale pink, the bill is dark brownish-black, and the iris is blackish. Both sexes look similar.

=== Vocalisations ===
The Bornean stubtail's vocalisations are poorly known, with the species usually staying silent. Its song is a single extremely high-pitched note 0.3–0.5 seconds long. The most common sound is a barely audible, high-pitched tsit-tst tseee or tzi-tzi-tzeeee 1.4 seconds long. Another vocalisation is a slightly lower, trilled piririt around 0.7 seconds long.

== Distribution and habitat ==
Endemic to Borneo, the Bornean stubtail is found in the mountain ranges of Borneo, from Mount Kinabalu south to Liang Kubung, the Müller Mountains, Mount Dulit, and Gunung Menyapa. It has also been recorded from the southeastern part of the Meratus Mountains in the southeastern part of the island. The species inhabits the forest floor and undergrowth of montane forests at altitudes of 750–3,150 m (2,460–10,330 ft).

== Behaviour and ecology ==
The species is usually found alone. It has a generation length of 3.6 years.

The Bornean stubtail feeds on invertebrates, especially green aphids. It forages on the ground and in dense undergrowth, creeping about in an inconspicuous manner more like that of a mouse than a bird. However, it can sometimes be quite curious and docile.

Nests consist mostly of reddish plant fibres and are built on mossy banks. The incubation of the eggs takes an average of 24 days, which is unusually long compared to other species in its range. The length is caused by the long periods of time (around 6–8 hours every day) that parents spend away from the nest.

== Status ==
The Bornean stubtail is classified as being of least concern by the International Union for Conservation of Nature due to its sufficiently large range and stable population. Its population has not been estimated, but it is a common species above elevations of 2,000 m (6,600 ft). It is present in some protected areas like Kinabalu Park.
