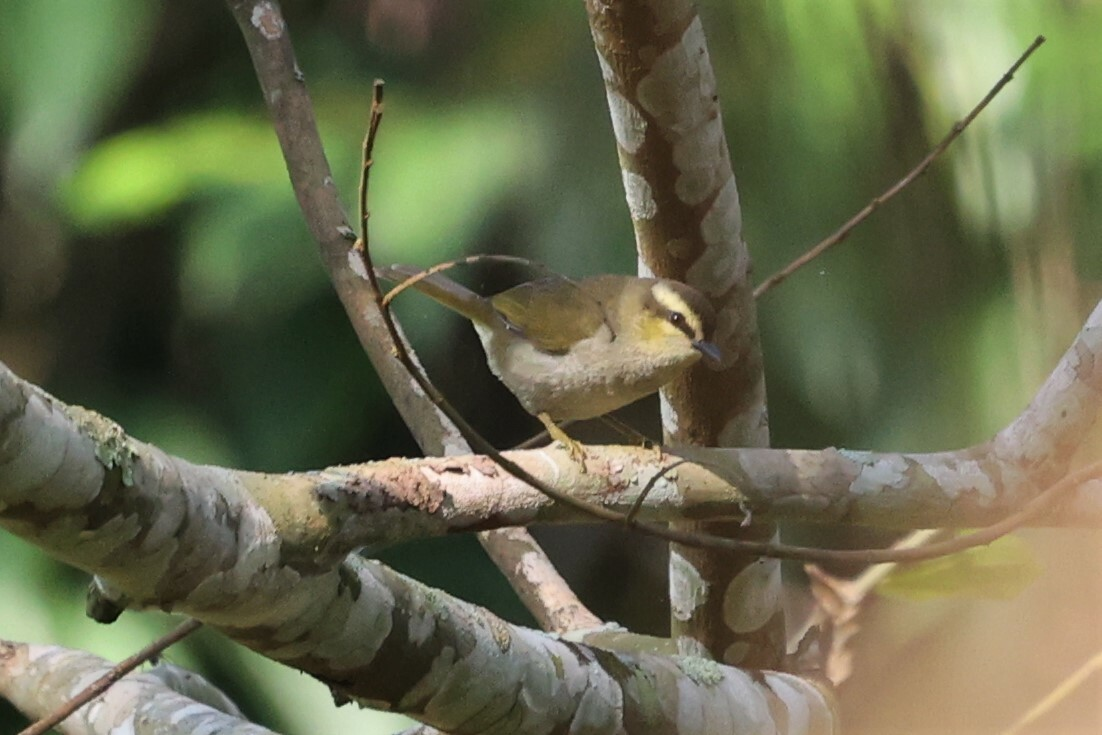

Conservation status
- Least Concern (IUCN 3.1)

Scientific classification
- Kingdom: Animalia
- Phylum: Chordata
- Class: Aves
- Order: Passeriformes
- Family: Hyliidae
- Genus: Hylia; Cassin, 1859
- Species: H. prasina

Binomial name
- Hylia prasina (Cassin, 1855)
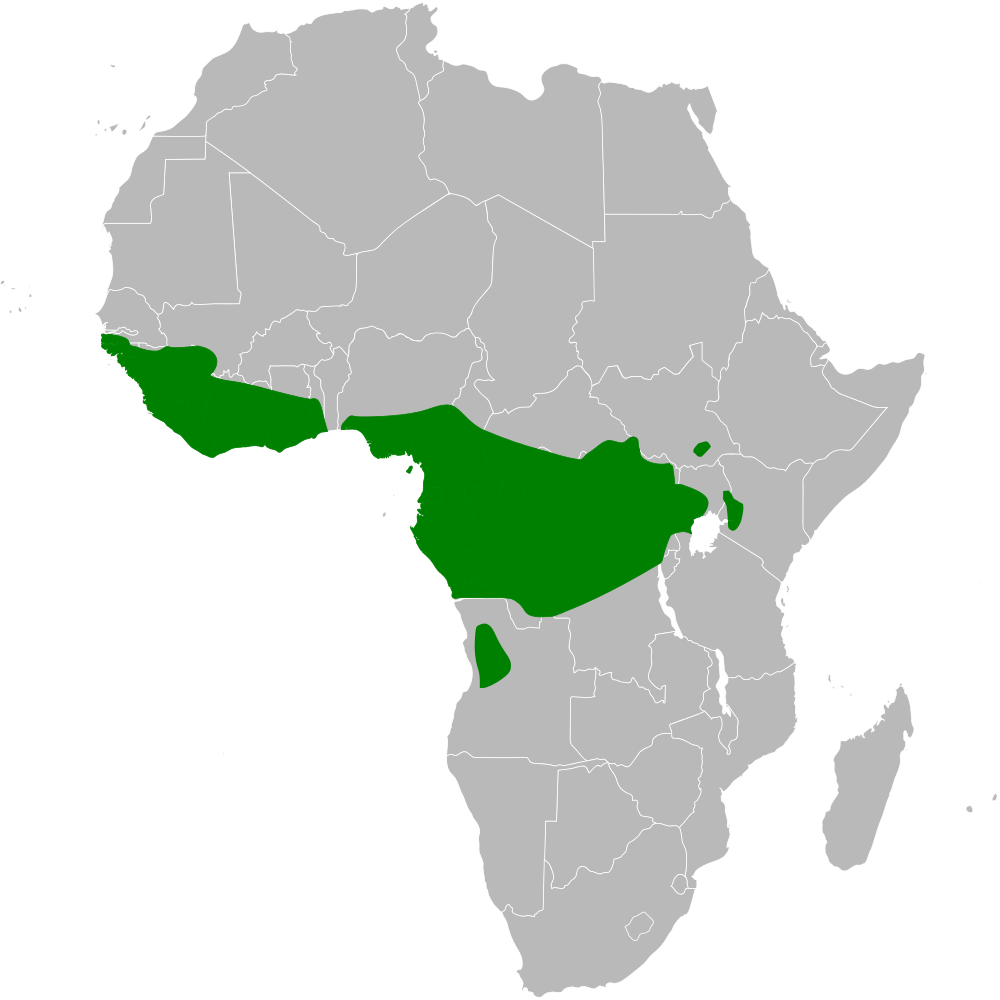

= Green hylia =

Species of bird

The green hylia (Hylia prasina) is a monotypic genus widespread in tropical Africa, where it mostly inhabits the understory and mid-stratum of moist forest. It is a canopy insectivore which had been tentatively placed within the family of Cettiidae warblers, but in 2019 its assignment to a new family, the Hyliidae, was strongly supported.

== Taxonomy ==
Hylia prasina is a monotypic songbird that has proven difficult to place within the phylogenetic tree. Connections between Hylia and other genera have been attempted by comparing DNA sequences, physical similarities and even behavioural characteristics. None of these links have been sufficiently proven to allow definite classification of the green hylia.

The green hylia belongs to the order Passeriformes and the superfamily Sylvioidea, however the classification at family level is under dispute. The species is often attributed to the family Cettiidae (bush warblers) along with Scotocerca, Erythrocercus, Tesia, Cettia and Abroscopus. Investigation into indels does not support a strong relationship between Hylia and the Cettiidae.

Anatomically, the green hylia has similarities to sunbirds and warblers. Characteristics shared with sunbirds include a long hyloid with flattened epibranchial horns, a brush-tipped tongue and membrane-covered nostrils. Similarities to some warblers include very comparable colouring. The relationship between the genera Hylia and Phylloscopus (leaf warblers) has been examined but seems to have low empirical support. A sister relationship between Hylia and Aegithalidae (long tailed tits) was similarly poorly supported. Close relationships with Nectariniidae (sunbirds), Estrildidae (finches) and Meliphagidae (honeyeaters) have also been rejected.

The sister relationship between Hylia and Pholidornis (tit hylia) is strongly supported, based on mitochondrial data and physiological similarities. It has been suggested that both genera should be placed in a new family 'Hyliidae', pending further confirmation. It is likely that the green hylia, along with other closely related species, have an uncertain position in the phylogenetic tree as a result of rapid radiation of the families within the Sylvioidea.

== Description ==
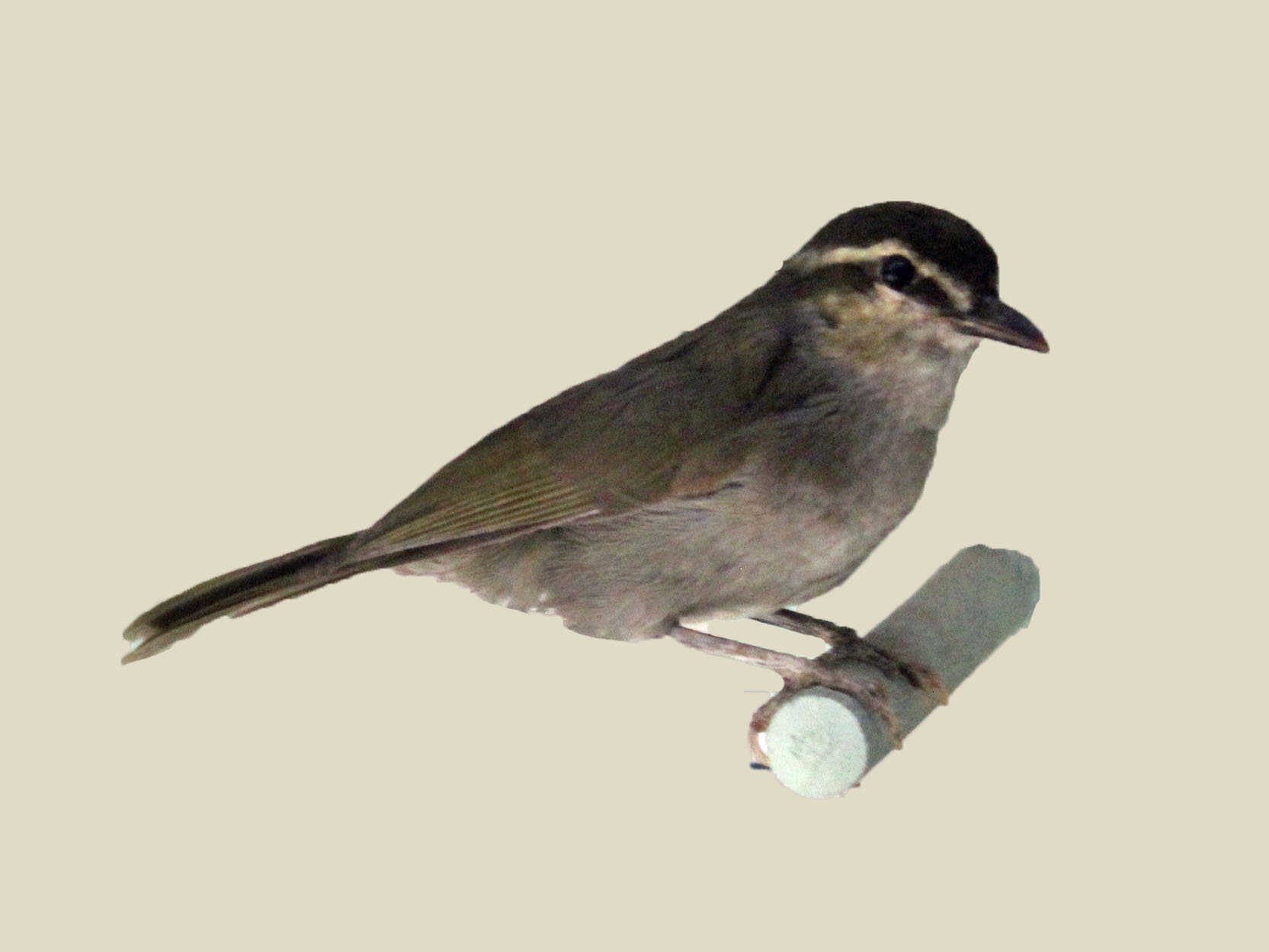
Specimen at Nairobi National Museum

The green hylia has dark brown irises, a black bill and olive green feet. This species is small, weighing approximately 14 g. There is no noticeable difference in colour between the sexes, however males are generally larger.

There are two subspecies, H. p. prasina and H. p. poensis, which differ in the colouring under the throat. H. p. prasina has an olive green chin and throat and olive-grey underbelly while H. p. poensis has a white-grey throat and underbelly.

=== Vocalisation ===
The green hylia uses several different calls, the most common being clear whistles (kee kee) or dry scolding rattles (trrit trrrit). It is known for its recognisable, pure, two-note song. Alarm calls used to warn of nearby predators are short as this makes it difficult for predators to locate exactly where the call is coming from.

When played imitation recordings, males reacted more strongly to longer notes. Analyses of green hylia songs indicated that a build-up of reverberations at the same frequency will lead to longer and louder note tails. This means that dense vegetation can alter birdsong transmissions to allow for a longer and louder signal, using the same amount of energy for vocalisation. The strengthening of the green hylia's song could be beneficial to the species for defending territory or attracting mates. The elongation of signals with narrow bandwidth has been found to be a beneficial consequence of reverberations on birdsong transmission.

Song characteristics will vary depending on habitat structure and ambient noise. Since the species uses narrow bandwidth songs they must adjust their frequency relative to influences such as insect vocalisations in order to be heard. Green hylias were found to sing at a lower frequencies when at higher elevations, cooler temperatures and lower tree coverage. When insect sounds are at a low frequency, the songs are found to be even lower. This behaviour has been interpreted as behavioural plasticity (auditory feedback in each specific environment to determine the clearest frequency), determination by genetic components, or a combination of both.

== Habitat and distribution ==
The green hylia occurs in a wide range throughout most of tropical Africa. The subspecies H. p. poensis can only be found on islands in the Gulf of Guinea. H. p. prasina is much more widely distributed throughout the Guineo-Congolian forest and is found from western Gambia to western Kenya.

The green hylia is a common forest generalist, occurring at forest edges and gaps between vegetation as well as forest interiors. Its preferred habitat is mostly intact, semideciduous moist forest. Green hylia habitat includes plant species such as Elaeis guinensis, Celtis zenkeri, Cola gigantea, Acalypha ornata, Markhamia platycalyx, Coffea canephora, Albizia sp., Fagara macrophylla, Funtumia elastica, Pycnanthes angolensis, Musanga cecropioides and Xylopia aethiopica. Liana and Scleria species provide suitable habitat as they tangle amongst other vegetation, providing nesting materials and a supply of food. Analysis of carbon sources in green hylia food, indicating the origin of the consumed insects, showed that carbon present derived exclusively from C3 plants, which are mostly forest plants, and not C4 plants as might be found in farmland crops, even when these areas border forest habitats.

== Ecology ==
The green hylia is a foliage-gleaning insectivore of the canopy and forest understory, usually foraging at a height of about 10 metres. Its diet includes insects, ants or butterflies which are accessible in its feeding area, on the underside of leaves or amongst forest litter. The species is considered a forest generalist as it is capable of surviving in a wide range of environmental conditions.

The green hylia is usually observed alone or in a mating pair. Mating pairs roost together in their nest. The eggs are white and otherwise not very distinctive. The nest is built a few feet from the ground in a suitable location, such as the vertical forks of young palm trees. The nest is oval and domed in shape with a 20 mm circular opening at the side of the top. Nests are crumbly and friable, the bulk being made up of loose tufts of plant matter which are not fragmented, interwoven or compacted. The outside is covered by a fine layer of fibrous strips topped with the occasional leaf skeleton. The nest measures 150 mm from top to bottom and 90 mm side to side and front to back. It differs from that of other sunbirds in that it is positioned in forks of vegetation and not suspended in the air.

== Threats ==
The green hylia is currently classified as Least Concern by the IUCN based on large population numbers and wide distribution. The species is however likely under pressure from habitat destruction. While the green hylia as a forest generalist is not as sensitive to habitat disruptions as other species, understory and leaf litter clearance does affect its opportunities for foraging and nest building. A significant decline in green hylia population has been observed in plantation areas (as opposed to logged areas) where these habitat components are absent.

The scarp forest habitat of the green hylia is increasingly being cleared for charcoal production and to make way for agriculture. The entire forest understory in certain areas is being cleared through slash and burn techniques to make way for the farming of crops such as bananas, maize or beans. These crops do not support species such as Hylia prasina as they do not possess sufficient understory environments. It is currently unknown how quickly the destruction of these habitats is occurring. While the green hylia has so far not been observed to be affected by this type of habitat clearing, many species with shared habitat requirements are in decline.

Parasites in African habitats may affect the species. Plasmodium parahexamerium was identified as infecting the green hylia in 2009, with as yet unclear ramifications. This parasite was thought to only inhabit New World hosts, thus its appearance in an Old World bird is both interesting and concerning. Despite this, parasites are not known to be a significant threat to the species as a whole.
