= Hylia =

Hylia may refer to:

- Green hylia, a species of songbird and the only species in genus Hylia
- Tit hylia, a species of songbird and the only species in genus Pholidornis
- Hylia (The Legend of Zelda), a fictional deity in the video game series The Legend of Zelda

== See also ==
- Hylian, race in The Legend of Zelda video game series
