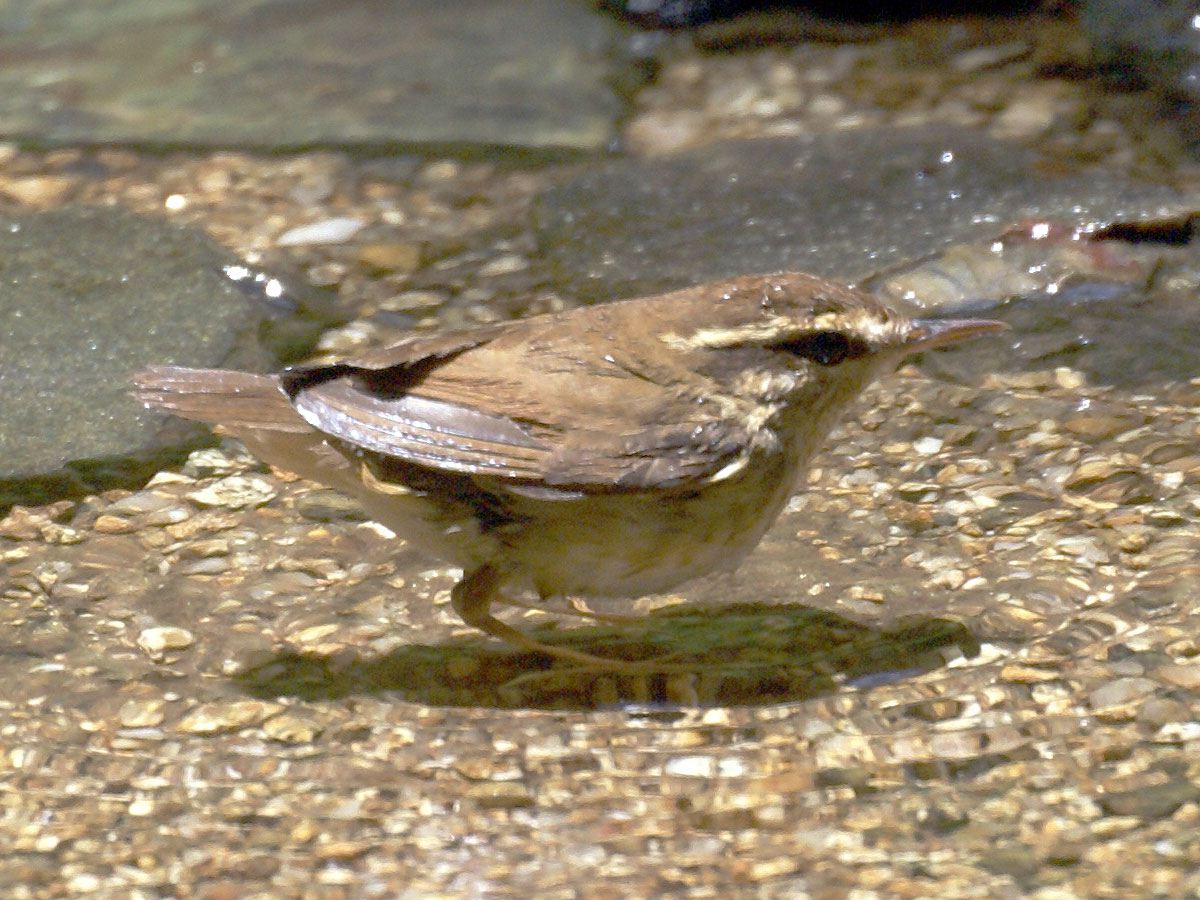
- Asian stubtail (Urosphena squameiceps)

Scientific classification
- Kingdom: Animalia
- Phylum: Chordata
- Class: Aves
- Order: Passeriformes
- Family: Cettiidae
- Genus: Urosphena; Swinhoe, 1877

Type species
- Tribura squameiceps Swinhoe, 1862

= Urosphena =

Genus of birds

Urosphena is a genus of Old World warblers in the family Cettiidae, formerly classified in the family Sylviidae. The genus was erected by Robert Swinhoe in 1877.

These warblers are generally brown on the upper parts and lighter in color below with a brown, gray, or yellowish wash. They are similar to genus Cettia but have shorter tails.

== Species ==
Image	Common name	Scientific name	Distribution
	Asian stubtail	Urosphena squameiceps	Taiwan, southeastern China, Nepal and Philippines
	Timor stubtail	Urosphena subulata	Timor and northern and eastern adjacent islands.
	Bornean stubtail	Urosphena whiteheadi	Borneo.
