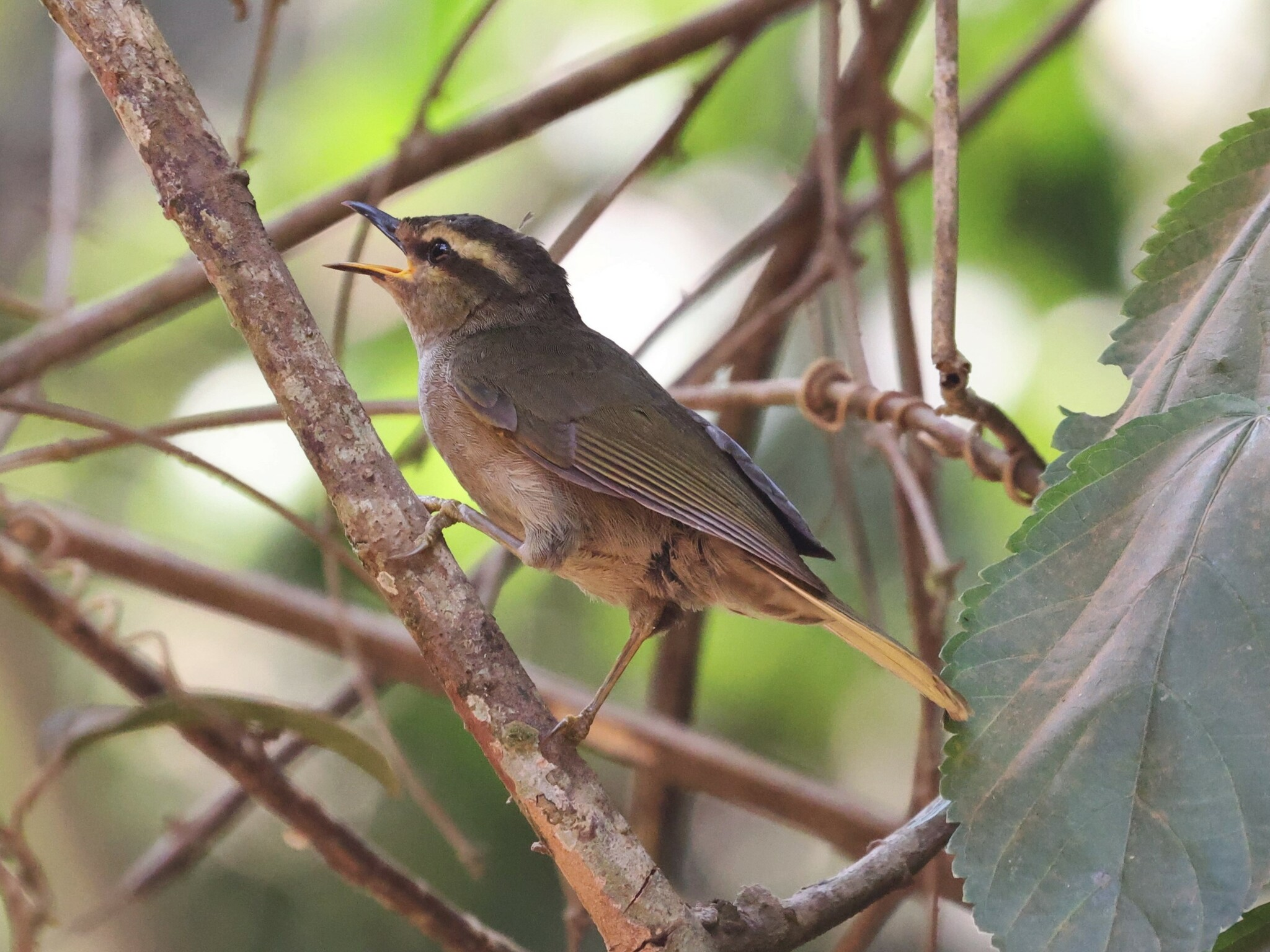
- Green hylia (Hylia prasina)

Scientific classification
- Kingdom: Animalia
- Phylum: Chordata
- Class: Aves
- Order: Passeriformes
- Superfamily: Aegithaloidea
- Family: Hyliidae; Bannerman, 1923

Genera
- Hylia; Pholidornis

= Hyliidae =

Family of birds

Hyliidae is a family of passerine birds which contains just two species, the green hylia (Hylia prasina) and the tit hylia (Pholidornis rushiae). Physiological similarities and molecular phylogenetic studies strongly support the creation of this family.

Some taxonomic authorities place the entire family in the Macrosphenidae.

Hylias are small, insectivorous songbirds found in tropical Africa. They frequent the understory of wet tropical forests.

== Taxonomy ==
The family Hyliidae was introduced in 1923 by the British ornithologist David Bannerman. The family contains just two species, each of which is placed in its own genus.

- - Aegithaloidea
    - - Phylloscopidae – leaf warblers (80 species)
      - - Hyliidae – hylias (2 species)
        - - Aegithalidae – bushtits (13 species)
          - - Erythrocercidae – flycatchers (3 species)
            - - Scotocercidae – streaked scrub warbler
              - Cettiidae – bush warblers and allies (32 species)

Cladogram showing the family relationships based on a study by Carl Oliveros and colleagues published in 2019. The number of species is taken from the bird list maintained by Frank Gill, Pamela Rasmussen and David Donsker on behalf of the International Ornithological Committee (IOC).

== Genera ==
- Pholidornis – tit hylia (formerly in Remizidae, then tentatively in Cettiidae)
- Hylia – green hylia (formerly tentatively placed in Cettiidae)
