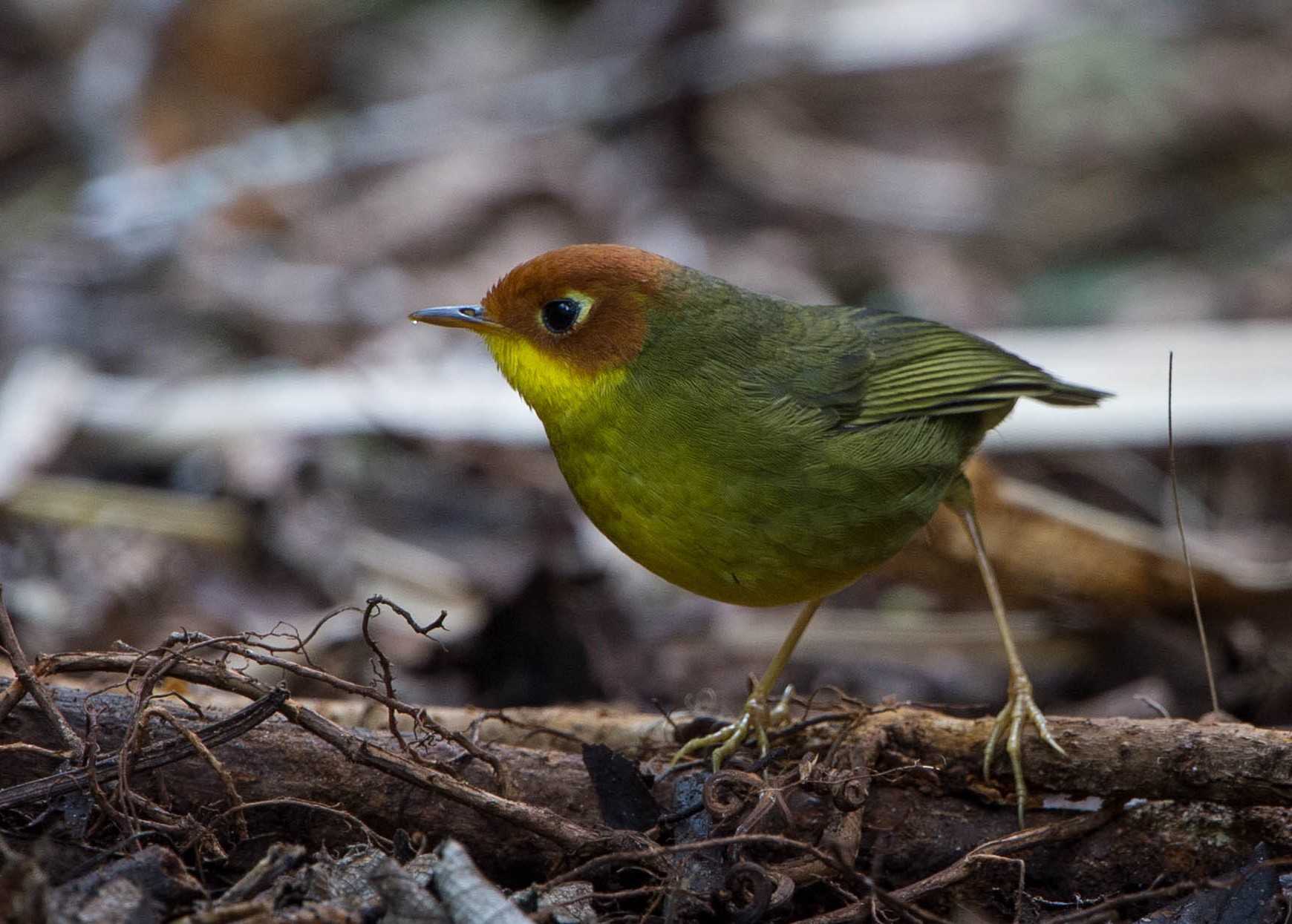
- Doi Lang, Chiang Mai, Thailand

Conservation status
- Least Concern (IUCN 3.1)

Scientific classification
- Kingdom: Animalia
- Phylum: Chordata
- Class: Aves
- Order: Passeriformes
- Family: Cettiidae
- Genus: Cettia
- Species: C. castaneocoronata

Binomial name
- Cettia castaneocoronata (Burton, 1836)

Synonyms
- Tesia castaneocoronata Oligura castaneicoronata (lapsus); Oligura castaneocoronata

= Chestnut-headed tesia =

Species of bird

The chestnut-headed tesia (Cettia castaneocoronata) is a small insectivorous songbird formerly of the "Old World warbler" family but nowadays placed in the bush warbler family (Cettiidae).

== Location and habitat ==
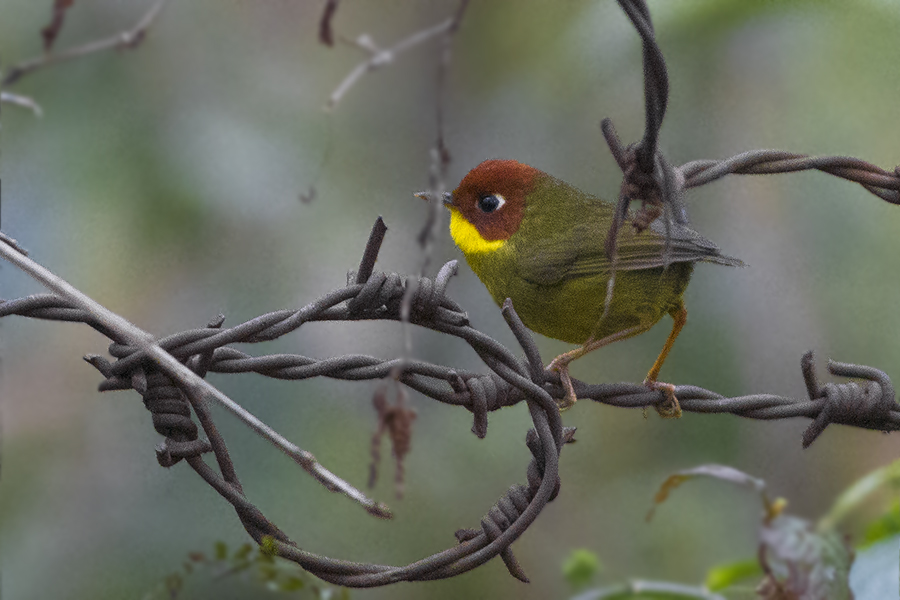
From Khangchendzonga Biosphere Reserve, India.

It is found in Bangladesh, Bhutan, China, India, Laos, Myanmar, Nepal, Thailand, and Vietnam. Its natural habitats are subtropical or tropical moist lowland forest and subtropical or tropical moist montane forest.

== Taxonomy ==
The chestnut-headed tesia was formally described by the English army officer and zoologist Edward Burton in 1836 under the binomial name Sylvia castaneocoronata. The specific epithet combines the Latin castaneus meaning "chestnut-coloured" and coronatus meaning "crowned". Formerly placed in the genus Tesia, a molecular phylogenetic study published in 2011 found that the chestnut-headed tesia was embedded in a clade containing members of the genus Cettia.

The phylogenetic relationships among the Cettia species are shown below, based on the data by the Cornell Lab of Ornithology.

- Cettia
  - - Chestnut-headed tesia, C. castaneocoronata
    - Chestnut-crowned bush warbler, C. major
  - - Grey-sided bush warbler, C. brunnifrons
    - Cetti's warbler, C. cetti

It split from the Chestnut-crowned bush warbler about 5 million years ago.

Three subspecies are recognised:

- C. c. castaneocoronata (Burton, 1836) – Himalayas and northeast India to south China and north Laos
- C. c. abadiei (Delacour & Jabouille, 1930) – north Vietnam
- C. c. ripleyi (Deignan, 1951) – Yunnan (south China)
