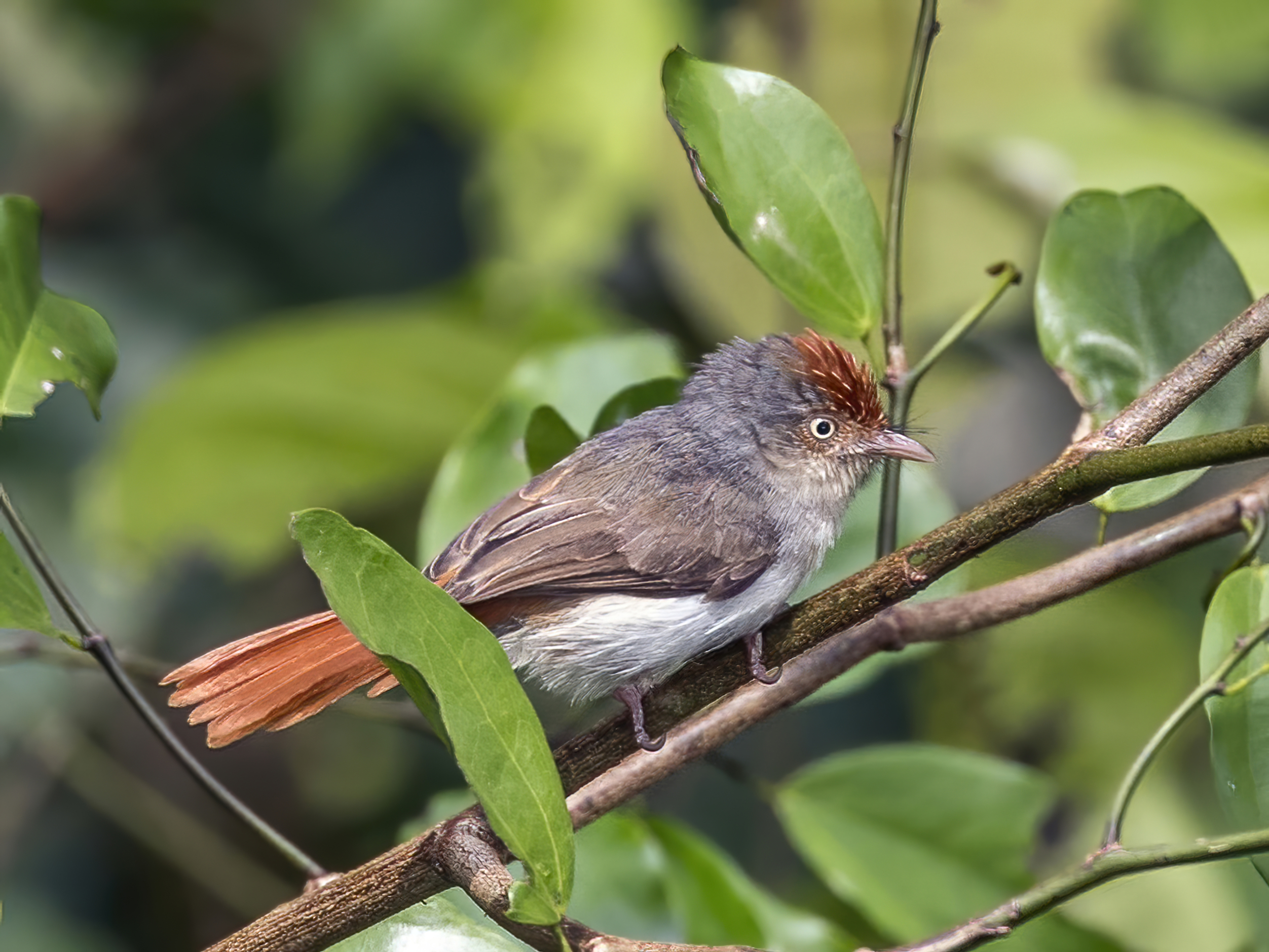
- E. m. nigeriae Kakum National Park, Ghana

Conservation status
- Least Concern (IUCN 3.1)

Scientific classification
- Kingdom: Animalia
- Phylum: Chordata
- Class: Aves
- Order: Passeriformes
- Family: Erythrocercidae
- Genus: Erythrocercus
- Species: E. mccallii

Binomial name
- Erythrocercus mccallii (Cassin, 1855)

Synonyms
- Erythrocercus maccalli

= Chestnut-capped flycatcher =

Species of bird

The chestnut-capped flycatcher (Erythrocercus mccallii) is a species of bird in the family Erythrocercidae.

== Distribution and habitat ==
It is found throughout the African tropical rainforest. Its natural habitats are subtropical or tropical swamps and subtropical or tropical moist montane forests.

== Subspecies ==
- E. m. mccallii: Southeast Nigeria to Cameroon, Gabon and Democratic Republic of the Congo
- E. m. nigeriae: Sierra Leone to Guinea and southwest Nigeria
- E. m. congicus: East and south Democratic Republic of the Congo to w Uganda
