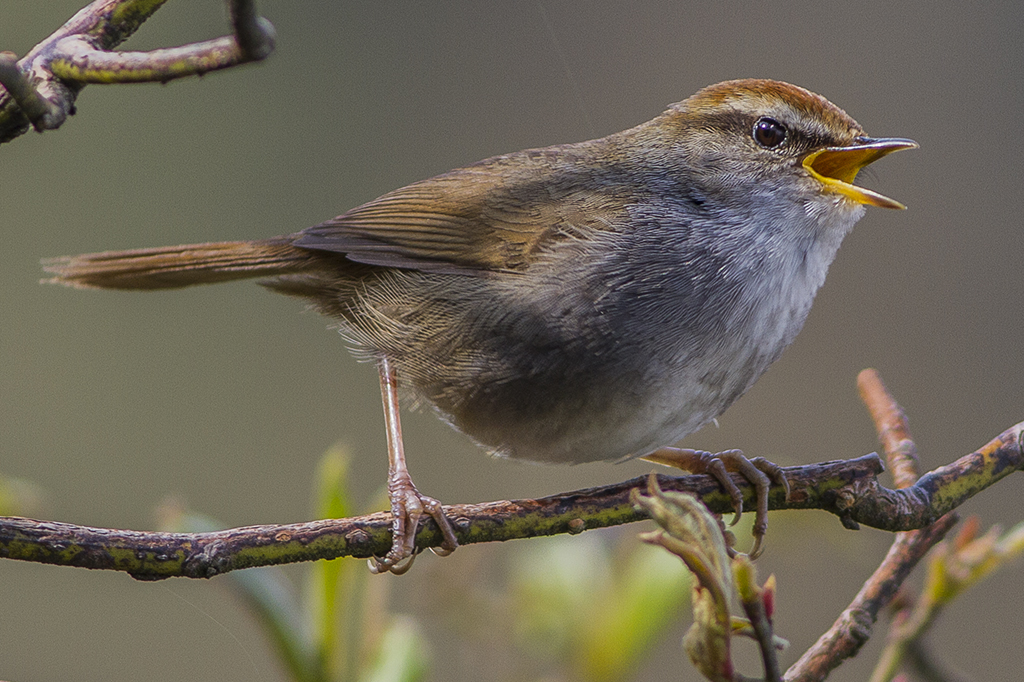
- Sikkim, India

Conservation status
- Least Concern (IUCN 3.1)

Scientific classification
- Kingdom: Animalia
- Phylum: Chordata
- Class: Aves
- Order: Passeriformes
- Family: Cettiidae
- Genus: Cettia
- Species: C. brunnifrons

Binomial name
- Cettia brunnifrons (Hodgson, 1845)

Synonyms
- Cettia brunneifrons

= Grey-sided bush warbler =

Species of bird

The grey-sided bush warbler (Cettia brunnifrons) is a species of bush warbler (family Cettiidae). It was formerly included in the "Old World warbler" assemblage.

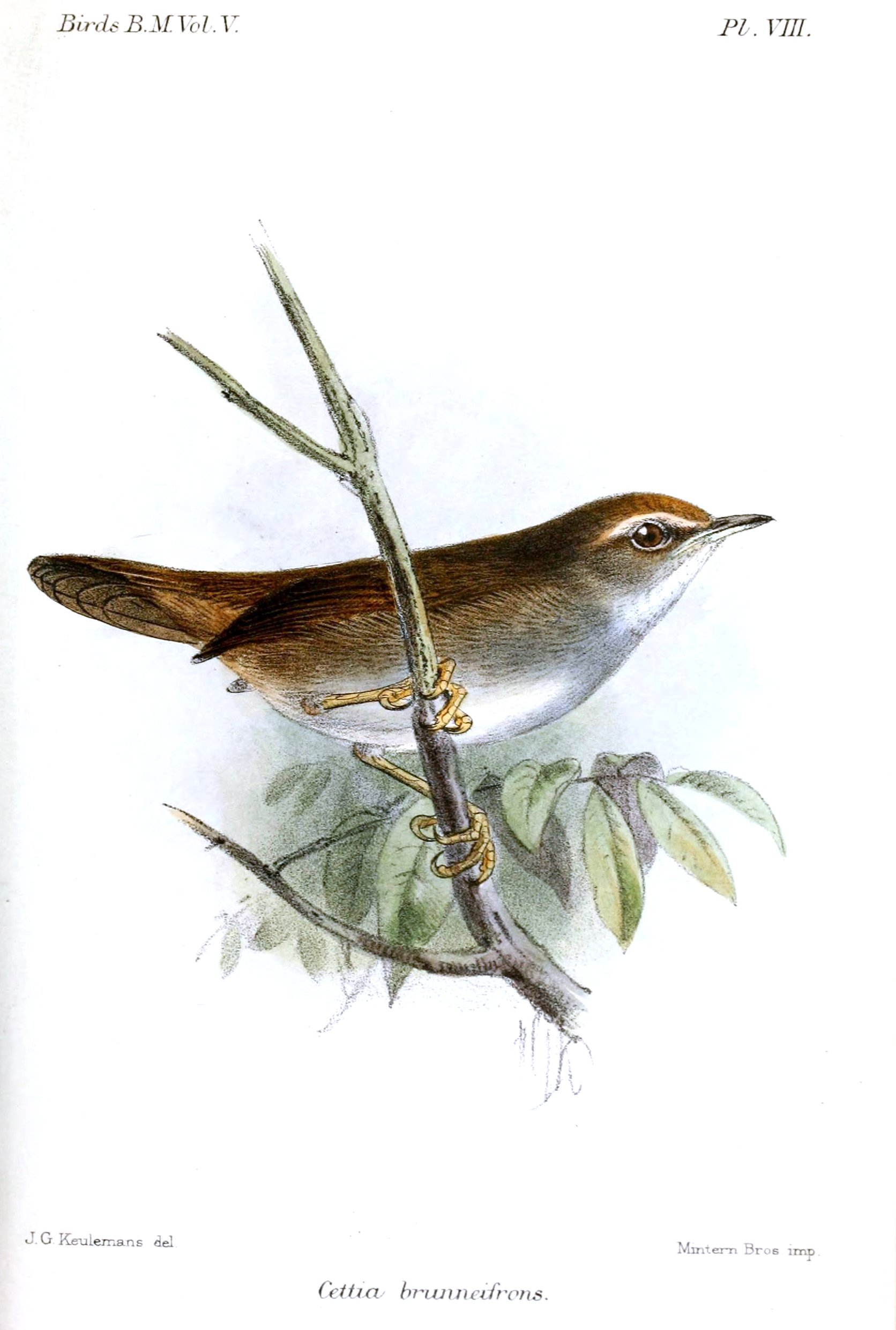
Illustration by Keulemans, 1881

It is found from northern Pakistan to central China.

The phylogenetic relationships among the Cettia species are shown below, based on the data by the Cornell Lab of Ornithology.

- Cettia
  - - Chestnut-headed tesia, C. castaneocoronata
    - Chestnut-crowned bush warbler, C. major
  - - Grey-sided bush warbler, C. brunnifrons
    - Cetti's warbler, C. cetti

It split from the Cetti's warbler about 5 million years ago.
