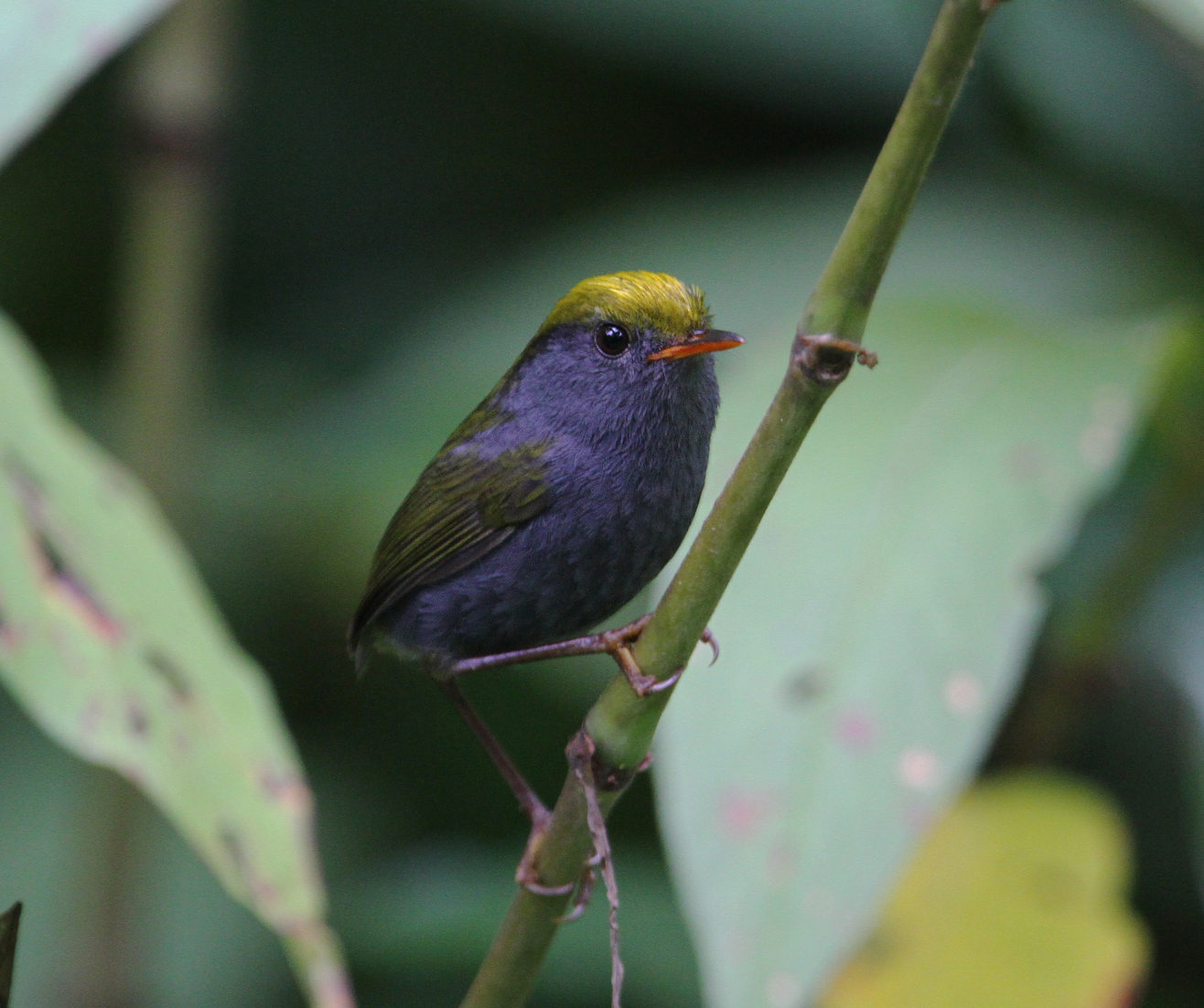

Conservation status
- Least Concern (IUCN 3.1)

Scientific classification
- Kingdom: Animalia
- Phylum: Chordata
- Class: Aves
- Order: Passeriformes
- Family: Cettiidae
- Genus: Tesia
- Species: T. olivea

Binomial name
- Tesia olivea (McClelland, 1840)

= Slaty-bellied tesia =

Species of bird

The slaty-bellied tesia (Tesia olivea) is a species of warbler in the family Cettiidae.

It is found in Bangladesh, Bhutan, China, India, Laos, Myanmar, Nepal, Thailand, and Vietnam. Its natural habitats are subtropical or tropical moist lowland forest and subtropical or tropical moist montane forest.
