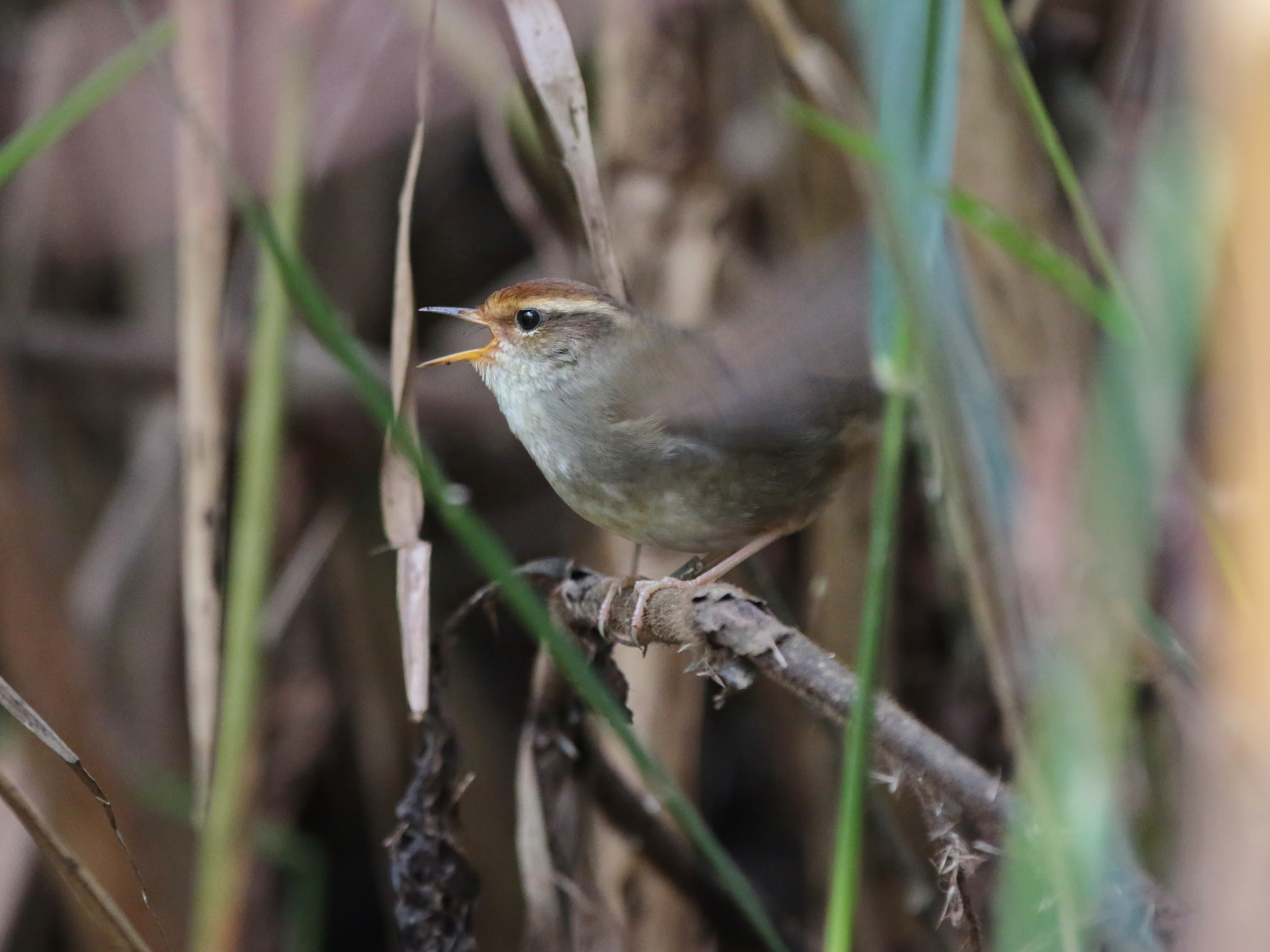

Conservation status
- Least Concern (IUCN 3.1)

Scientific classification
- Kingdom: Animalia
- Phylum: Chordata
- Class: Aves
- Order: Passeriformes
- Family: Cettiidae
- Genus: Cettia
- Species: C. major

Binomial name
- Cettia major (Moore, F, 1854)

= Chestnut-crowned bush warbler =

Species of bird

The chestnut-crowned bush warbler (Cettia major) is a species of warbler found in South Asia. Although overall population size has not been quantified, this is one of the species that is declining due to habitat destruction. Although its population trend is observed to be decreasing, its decline is not happening in rapid fashion. For this reason, this is evaluated as least concern species.

The phylogenetic relationships among the Cettia species are shown below, based on the data by the Cornell Lab of Ornithology.

- Cettia
  - - Chestnut-headed tesia, C. castaneocoronata
    - Chestnut-crowned bush warbler, C. major
  - - Grey-sided bush warbler, C. brunnifrons
    - Cetti's warbler, C. cetti

It split from the Chestnut-headed tesia about 5 million years ago.
