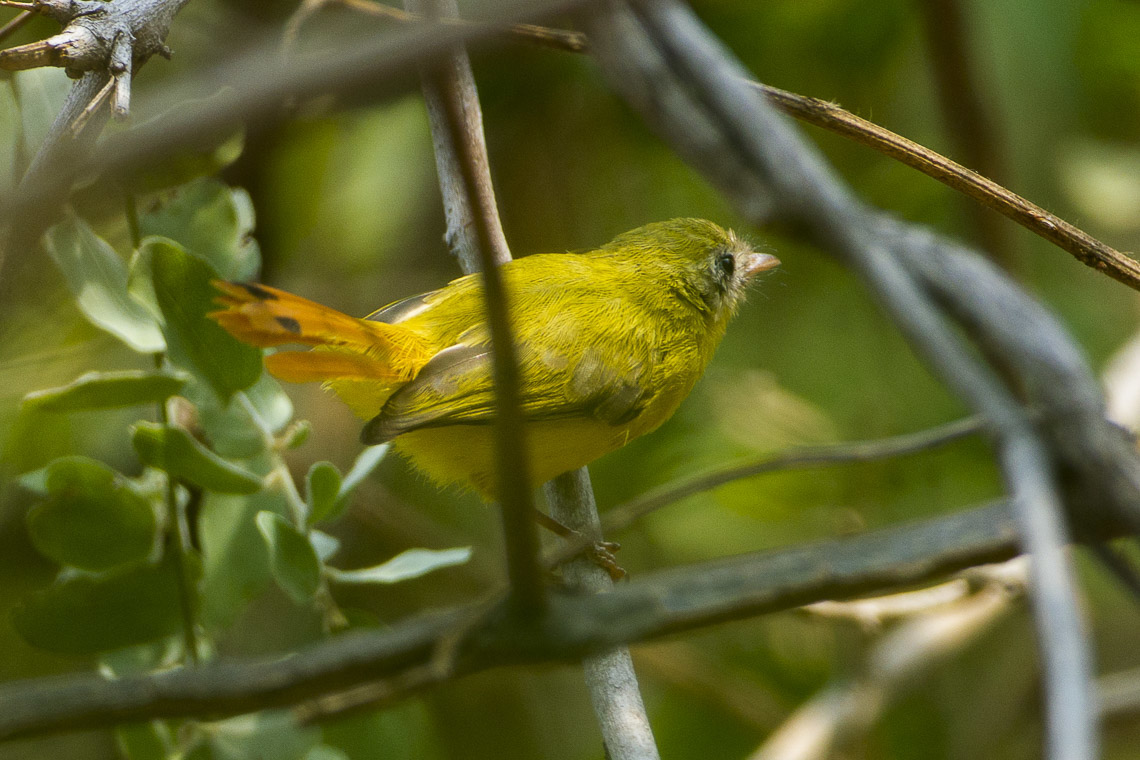

Conservation status
- Least Concern (IUCN 3.1)

Scientific classification
- Kingdom: Animalia
- Phylum: Chordata
- Class: Aves
- Order: Passeriformes
- Family: Erythrocercidae
- Genus: Erythrocercus
- Species: E. livingstonei

Binomial name
- Erythrocercus livingstonei Gray, GR, 1870

Synonyms
- Erythrocercus livingstonii

= Livingstone's flycatcher =

Species of bird

Livingstone's flycatcher (Erythrocercus livingstonei) is a species of bird in the family Erythrocercidae. It is found in Malawi, Mozambique, Tanzania, Zambia, and Zimbabwe. Its natural habitats are subtropical or tropical dry forests and subtropical or tropical moist shrubland.
