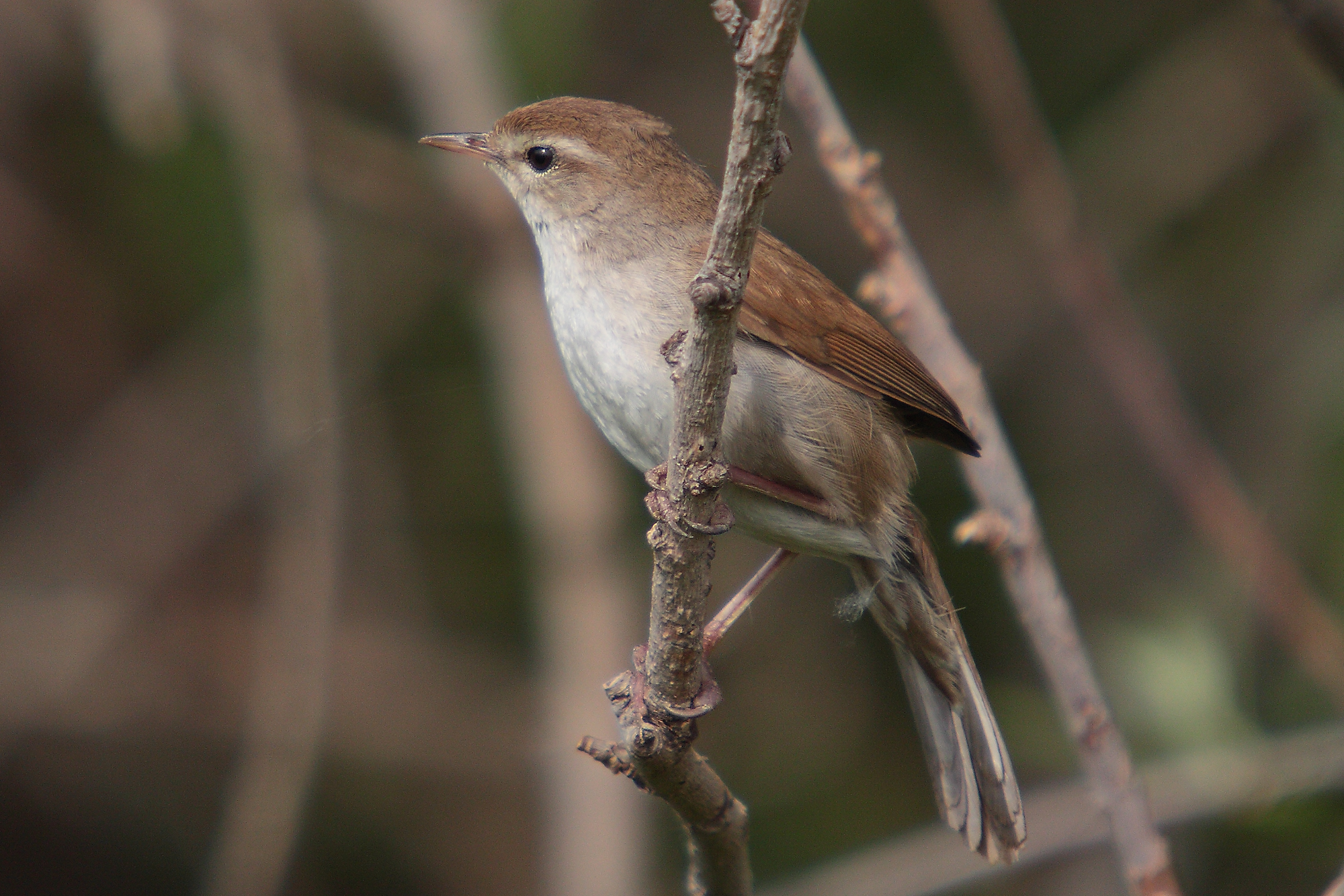
- By the Kalloni east river, Lesvos, Greece

Conservation status
- Least Concern (IUCN 3.1)

Scientific classification
- Kingdom: Animalia
- Phylum: Chordata
- Class: Aves
- Order: Passeriformes
- Family: Cettiidae
- Genus: Cettia
- Species: C. cetti

Binomial name
- Cettia cetti (Temminck, 1820)
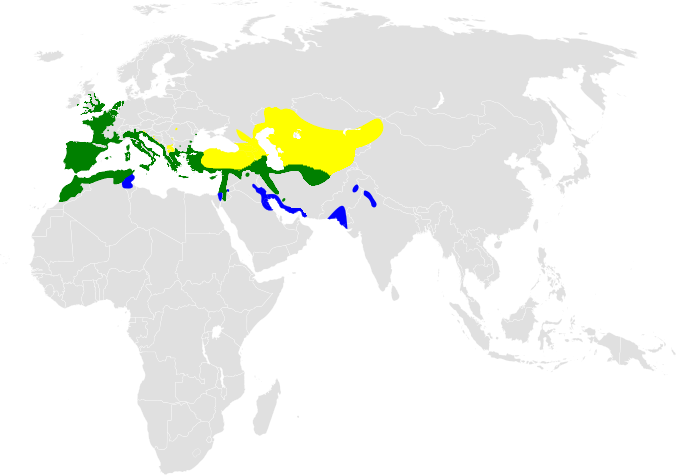
- Distribution of Cetti's warbler Breeding summer visitor Breeding resident Non-breeding winter

Audio
- Song

= Cetti's warbler =

Species of bird

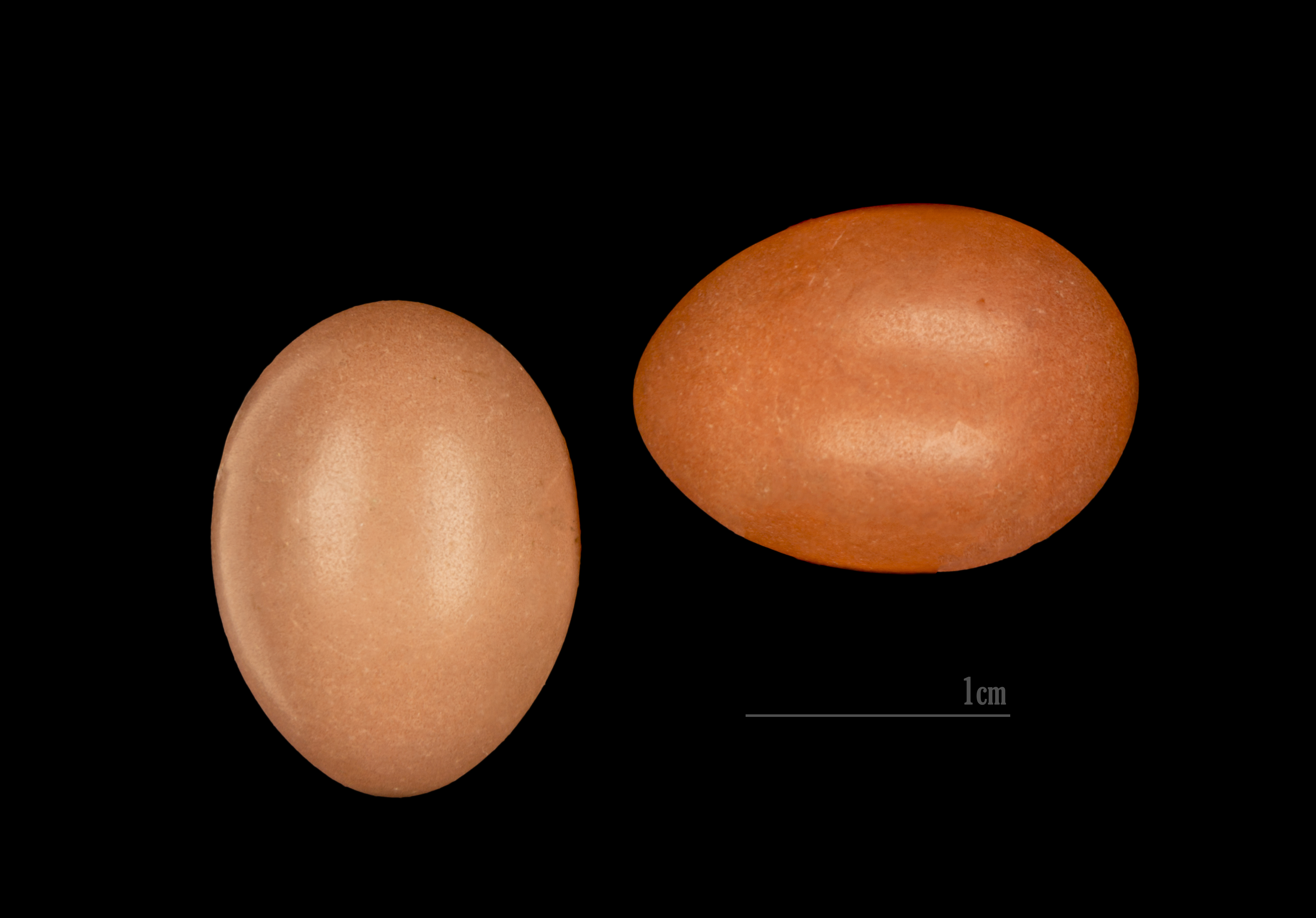
Eggs MHNT

Cetti's warbler /ˈtʃɛti/ (Cettia cetti) is a small, brown warbler in the family Cettiidae, which breeds in southern and western Europe, northwest Africa and the east Palearctic as far as Afghanistan and northwest Pakistan. The sexes are alike. The bird is named after the 18th-century Italian zoologist, Francesco Cetti. This species is often difficult to see because of its skulking habits.

== Taxonomy ==
Cetti's warbler was described in 1820 by the Dutch zoologist Coenraad Jacob Temminck from specimens collected by Alberto della Marmora in Sardinia. Temminck coined the binomial name Sylvia cetti. The specific epithet was chosen to commemorate the Italian zoologist Francesco Cetti. Cetti's warbler is now placed in the genus Cettia that was erected in 1834 by the French ornithologist Charles Lucien Bonaparte, a nephew of Napoleon, with Cetti's warbler as the type species.

The phylogenetic relationships among the Cettia species are shown below, based on the data by the Cornell Lab of Ornithology.

- Cettia
  - - Chestnut-headed tesia, C. castaneocoronata
    - Chestnut-crowned bush warbler, C. major
  - - Grey-sided bush warbler, C. brunnifrons
    - Cetti's warbler, C. cetti

Three subspecies are recognised:

- C. c. cetti (Temminck, 1820) – west Europe to Greece and the Balkans, northwest Africa
- C. c. orientalis Tristram, 1867 – Turkey to Iran and Afghanistan
- C. c. albiventris Severtsov, 1873 – Kazakhstan and Turkmenistan to northwest China and north Afghanistan

== Description ==
Cetti's warbler is approximately 13–14 cm (5.1–5.5 in) from bill to tail. The male weighs 15 g (0.53 oz) and the female 12 g (0.42 oz). Cetti's warbler has a rounded head with a narrow pale grey stripe arching over conspicuous black eyes, and short, rounded wings. The upperparts are a rich chestnut or dark reddish-brown; the throat and breast are pale grey-brown. The tail is longer and broader than many other warblers. The sexes have similar plumage, but males are 26% to 32% heavier than females with a wing-length 11.2% to 13% longer. The male has a wing longer than 60 mm; the female has a wing shorter than 55 mm. The birds can be aged by their plumage; juveniles look similar to adults but have fresh plumage and two dark or dark grey spots on the tongue. Cetti's warbler is unusual among passerine birds in having ten tail feathers (rectrices) rather than the usual twelve.

Cetti's warblers signal their presence with loud song. Their song is distinct, comes in loud bursts, and has a unique structure that allows the birds to avoid mating with other species.

== Distribution and habitat ==
Cetti's warbler usually inhabits thick shrubby vegetation in damp areas close to (but not in) ponds, lakes, marshes and rivers.

The number of Cetti's warblers has greatly increased across Europe since 1990. The current population of Cetti's warblers in Europe is estimated to be about 600,000-1,600,000 breeding pairs. The populations in Italy and Turkey are known to be stable or increasing. The exception to the general positive European population trend is in Greece, where the population decreased slightly between 1990 and 2000. However, overall, Cetti's warblers are evaluated as secure. Cetti's warbler was first recorded in the United Kingdom in 1961, with the first breeding in 1972–73. Population growth was rapid at first, then fell by over a third between 1984 and 1986 following the severe 1985–86 winter, but rebounded again rapidly thereafter. UK populations continue to grow; by 2016 there were 3,450 territorial males, distributed throughout most of England and Wales, with the first breeding in Scotland in 2023. It was first recorded in Ireland in 2013, with the first breeding in 2022.

== Behaviour ==
=== Breeding ===
During the summer, the males spend most of their time establishing their territories. While doing this, they spend little amount of time caring for the eggs or young. Afterwards, the males usually attract more than one female to their territory. Their song plays an important role.

In Europe the main period for egg laying is from the middle to the end of June. The nest is placed in thick dense vegetation usually at around 30 to 45 cm (12 to 18 in) above the ground. The untidy cup shaped nest is made from leaves and stems and is lined with feathers, hair and other finer material. It is built entirely by the female. The eggs are laid in the early morning at daily intervals and are chestnut red in colour. The clutch consists of 4 to 5 eggs which measure approximately 18.0 mm × 13.9 mm (0.71 in × 0.55 in). The eggs are incubated by the female beginning when the clutch is complete and hatch after 16 to 17 days. The young are mainly fed and brooded by the female. They fledge after 14 to 16 days but continue to be fed by the parents for at least another 15 days. The young become independent by 30 days. In Europe Cetti's warblers normally have two broods each year. They first breed when one year of age.

=== Feeding ===
Cetti's warbler is insectivorous, preying on arthropods such as small, soft-bodied insects and larvae. Cetti's warblers prefer tiny insects because they can digest them faster.

== Sources ==
- Cramp, Stanley, ed. (1992). "Cetia cetti Cetti's Warbler". Handbook of the Birds of Europe the Middle East and North Africa. The Birds of the Western Palearctic. Vol. VI: Warblers. Oxford: Oxford University Press. pp. 7–19. ISBN 978-0-19-857509-2.
