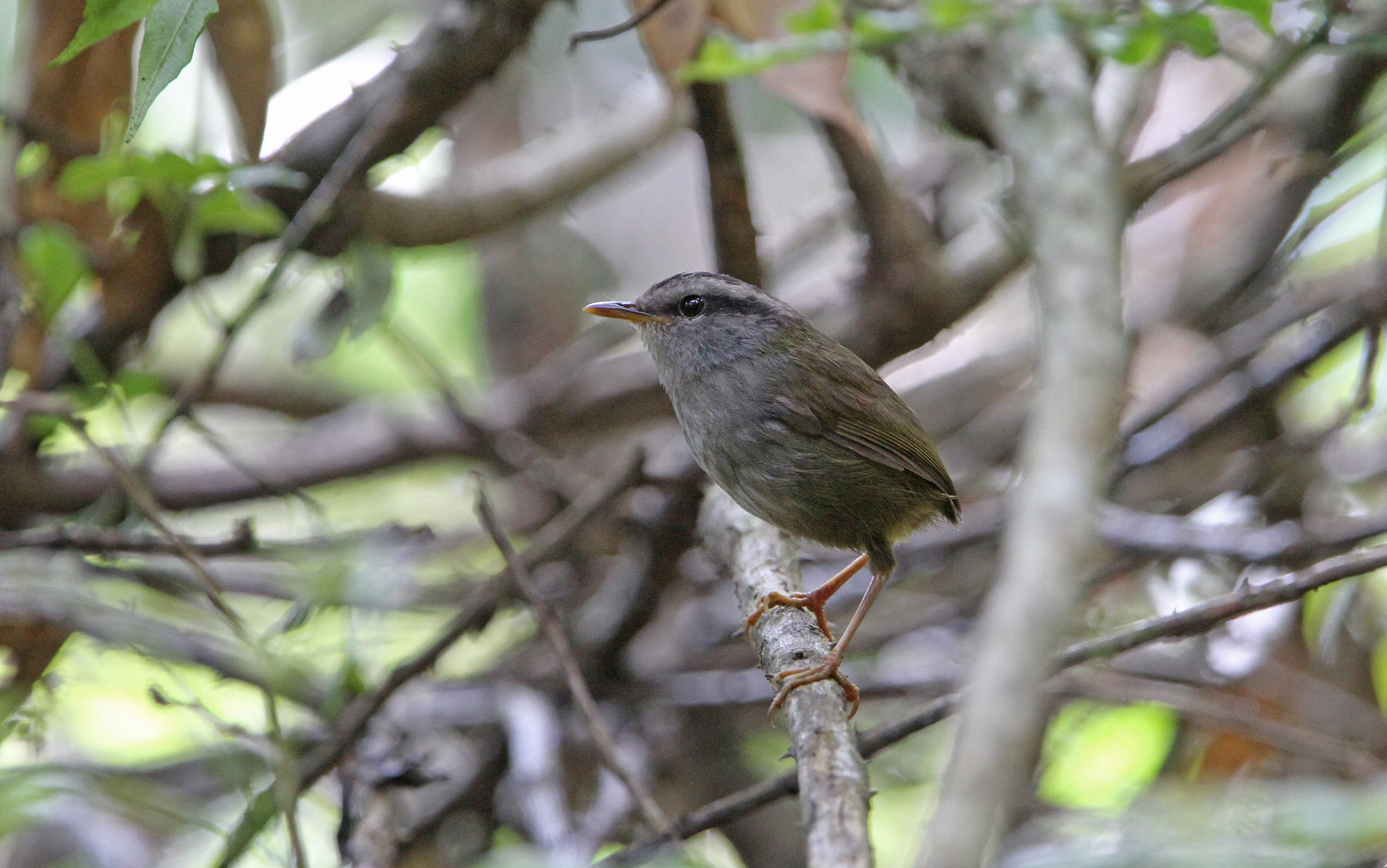

Conservation status
- Least Concern (IUCN 3.1)

Scientific classification
- Kingdom: Animalia
- Phylum: Chordata
- Class: Aves
- Order: Passeriformes
- Family: Cettiidae
- Genus: Tesia
- Species: T. superciliaris

Binomial name
- Tesia superciliaris (Bonaparte, 1850)

= Javan tesia =

Species of bird

The Javan tesia (Tesia superciliaris) is a species of Old World warbler in the family Cettiidae. It is endemic to Java in Indonesia. The Javan tesia is a small tesia with long legs and almost no tail. It feeds on insects in the undergrowth of broadleaf forest.
