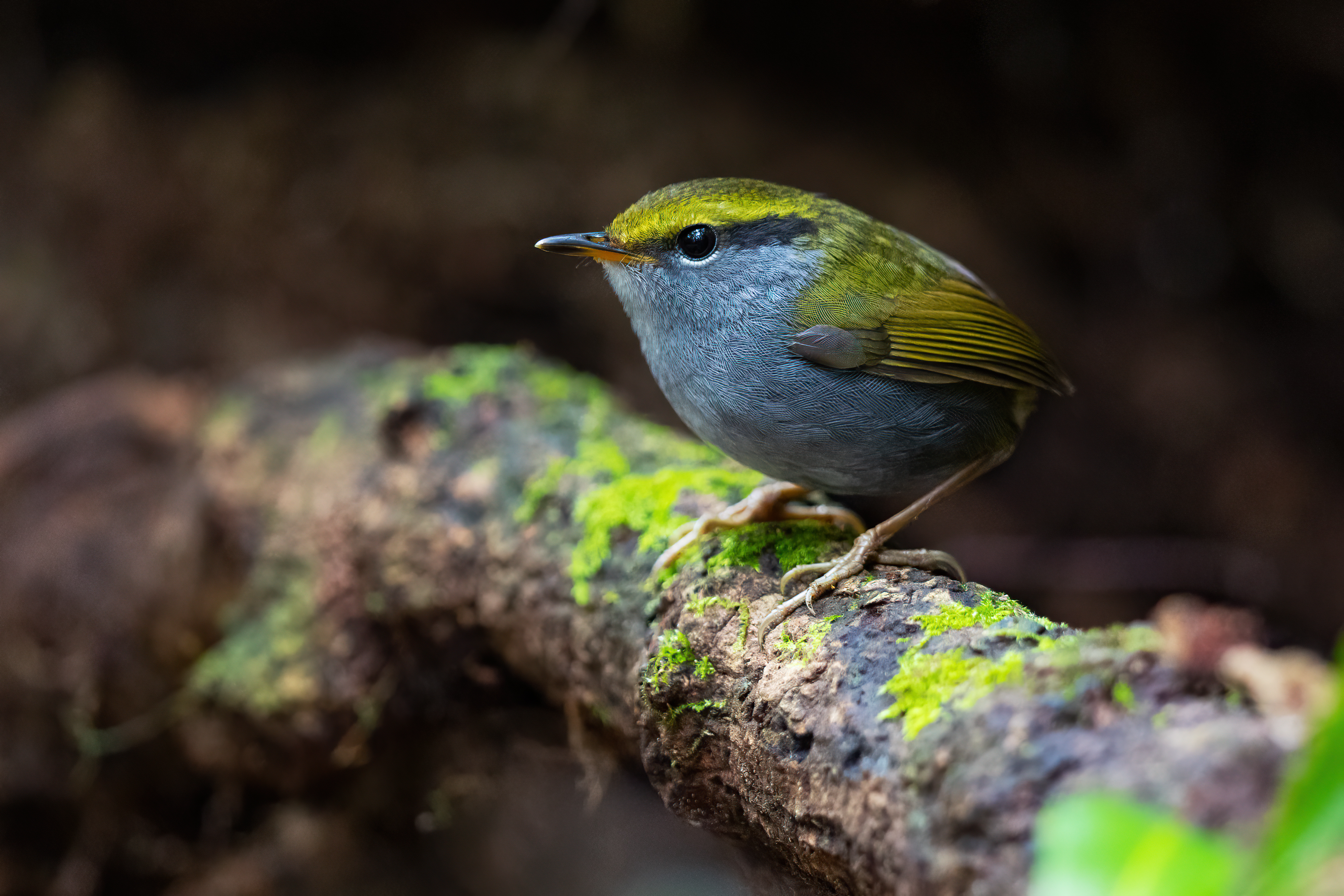
- Grey-bellied tesia

Conservation status
- Least Concern (IUCN 3.1)

Scientific classification
- Kingdom: Animalia
- Phylum: Chordata
- Class: Aves
- Order: Passeriformes
- Family: Cettiidae
- Genus: Tesia
- Species: T. cyaniventer

Binomial name
- Tesia cyaniventer Hodgson, 1837

= Grey-bellied tesia =

Species of bird

The grey-bellied tesia (Tesia cyaniventer) is a species of warbler in the family Cettiidae.

Its range extends from the Himalayas through southern China and Indochina (the Cardamom and Annamite ranges in particular).

Its natural habitat is subtropical or tropical moist montane forest.

== Diet ==
It is an insectivore.
