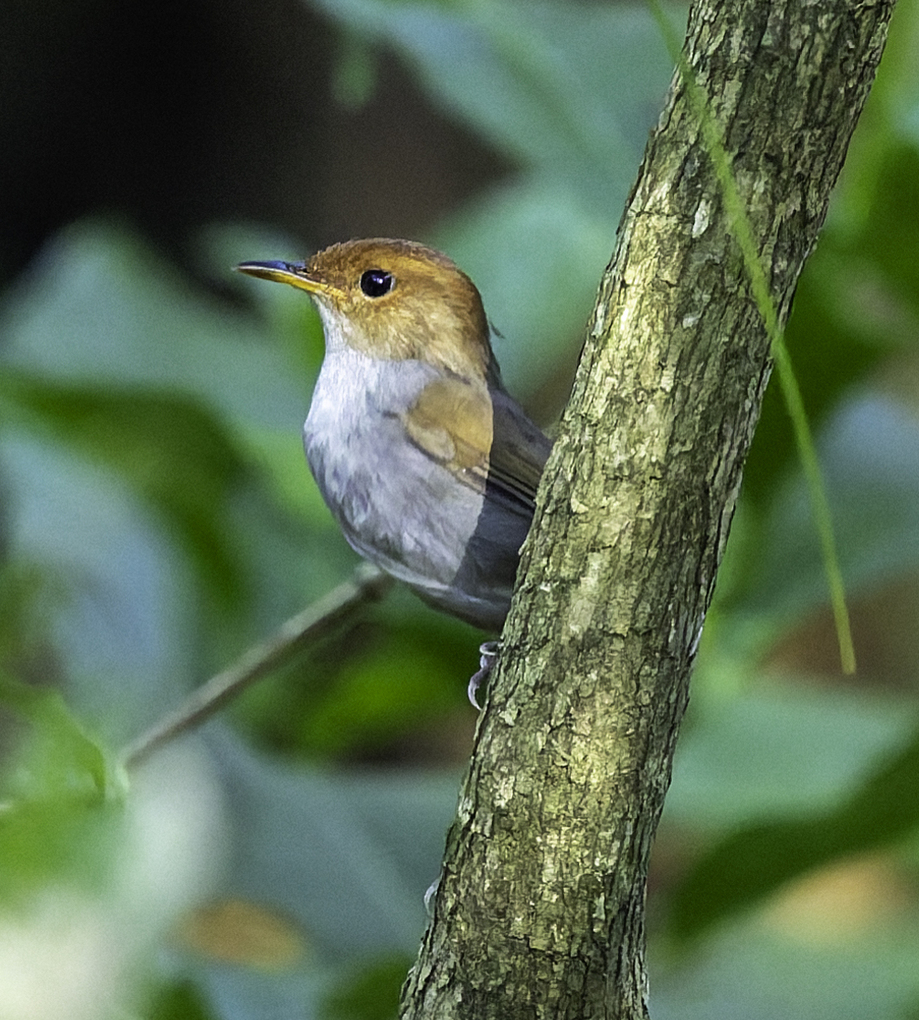

Conservation status
- Least Concern (IUCN 3.1)

Scientific classification
- Kingdom: Animalia
- Phylum: Chordata
- Class: Aves
- Order: Passeriformes
- Family: Cettiidae
- Genus: Tesia
- Species: T. everetti

Binomial name
- Tesia everetti (Hartert, 1897)

= Russet-capped tesia =

Species of bird

The russet-capped tesia (Tesia everetti) is a species of Old World warbler in the family Cettiidae. The scientific name commemorates British colonial administrator and zoological collector Alfred Hart Everett.

== Distribution and habitat ==
It is found only in Indonesia.
