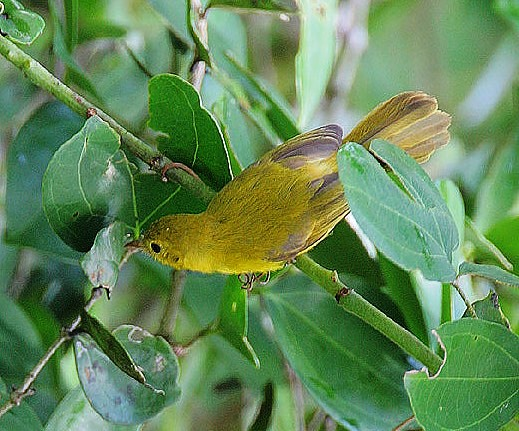

Conservation status
- Least Concern (IUCN 3.1)

Scientific classification
- Kingdom: Animalia
- Phylum: Chordata
- Class: Aves
- Order: Passeriformes
- Family: Erythrocercidae
- Genus: Erythrocercus
- Species: E. holochlorus

Binomial name
- Erythrocercus holochlorus Erlanger, 1901

= Little yellow flycatcher =

Species of bird

The little yellow flycatcher (Erythrocercus holochlorus) is a species of bird in the family Erythrocercidae. It is found in Kenya, Somalia, and Tanzania. Its natural habitats are subtropical or tropical moist lowland forest and subtropical or tropical moist shrubland.
