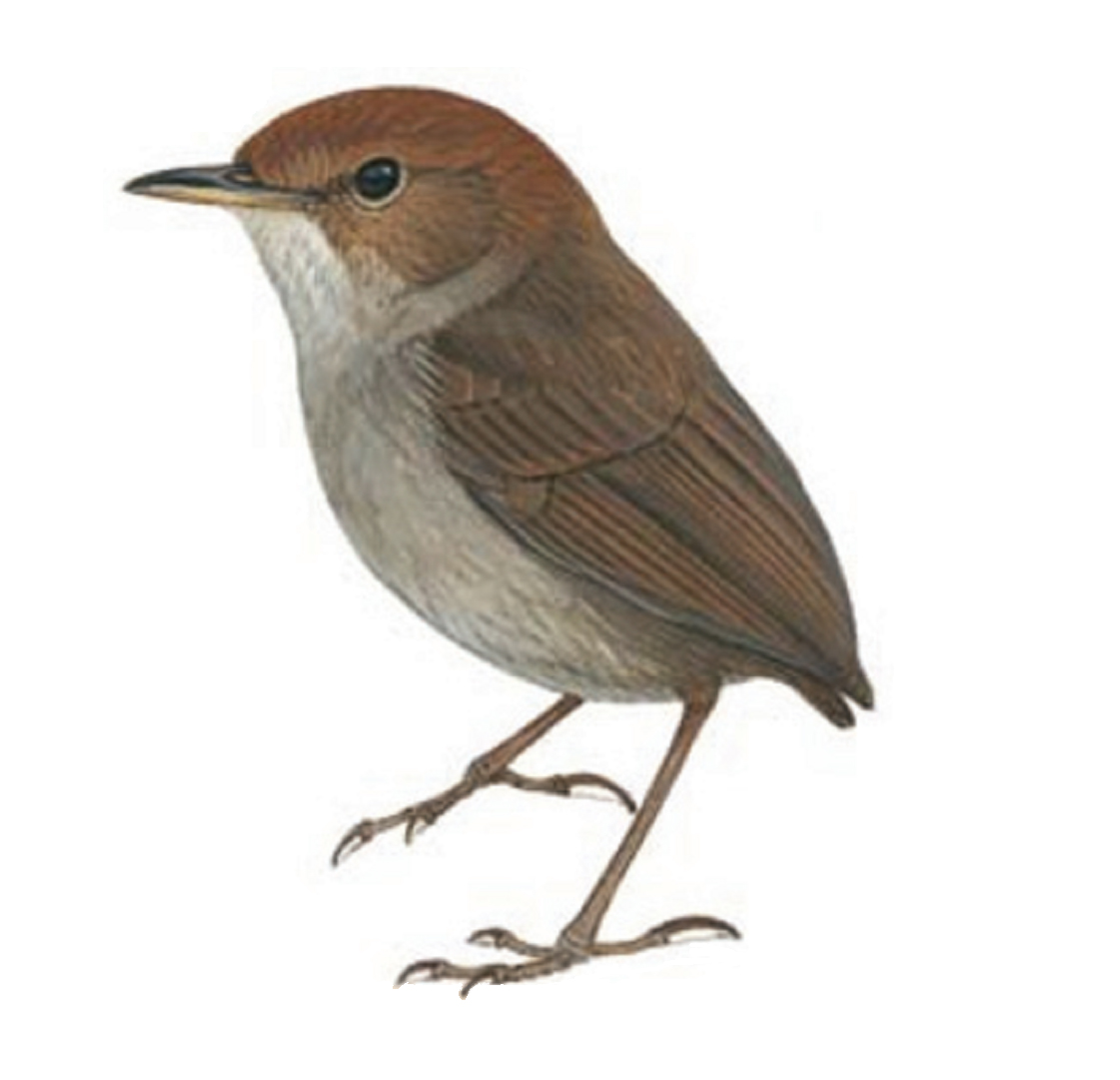
- Russet-capped tesia (Tesia everetti)

Scientific classification
- Kingdom: Animalia
- Phylum: Chordata
- Class: Aves
- Order: Passeriformes
- Family: Cettiidae
- Genus: Tesia; Hodgson, 1837

Type species
- Tesia cyaniventer Hodgson, 1837
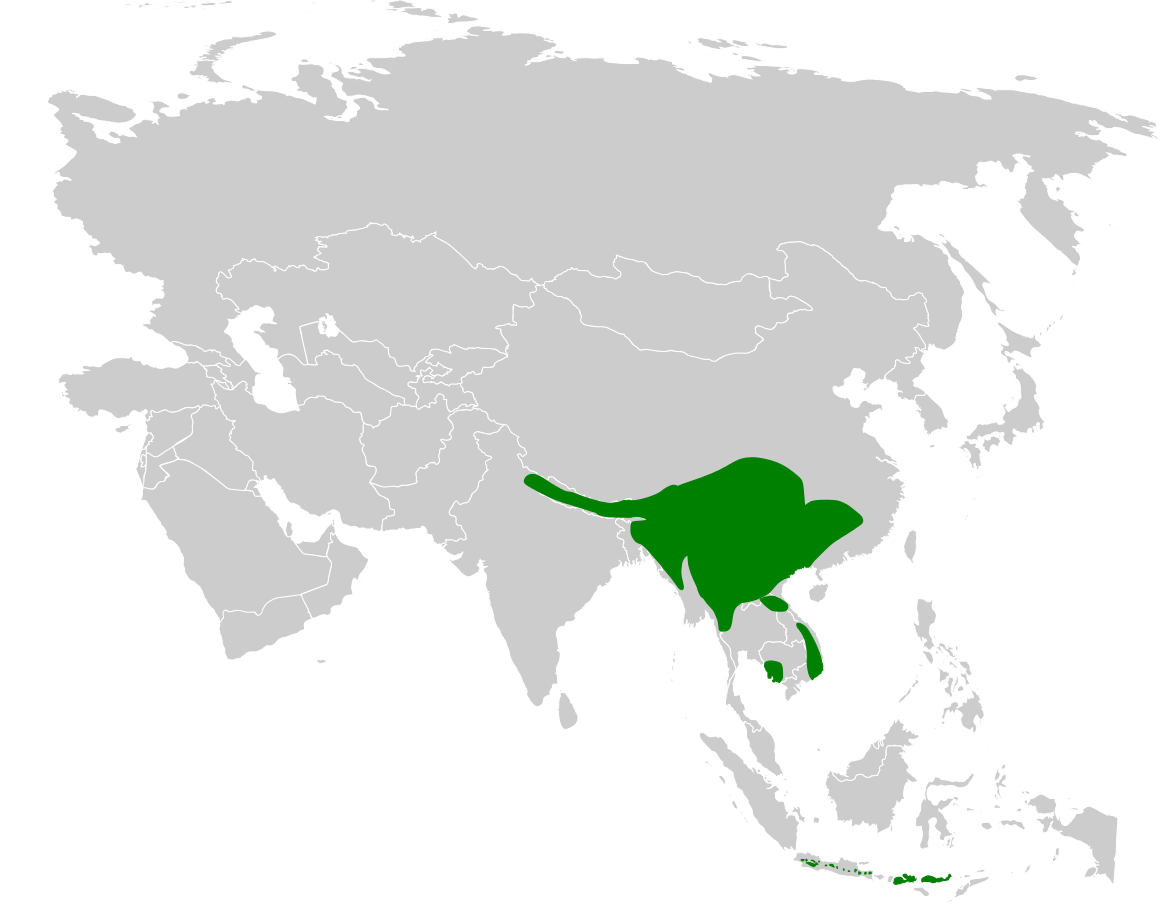

= Tesia =

Genus of birds

The tesias are a genus, Tesia, of Old World warbler. Though once included in the large family Sylviidae, more recent research placed it within a new family, Cettiidae. The four species inhabit undergrowth of montane forest in South and Southeast Asia, where they are resident or short-range migrants. They have longish legs and appear tailless, with (seemingly) only 8 rectrices. Their simple songs are fairly loud, and their nests are typically ball-shaped. Their name is derived from Tisi, the Nepalese name for the grey-bellied tesia (Tesia cyaniventer).

== Taxonomy ==
The genus Tesia was erected in 1837 by the English naturalist Brian Houghton Hodgson. The name is from the Nepalese word Tisi for the grey-bellied tesia. The type species was designated as the grey-bellied tesia (Tesia cyaniventer) by the English zoologist George Robert Gray in 1847. The chestnut-headed tesia was formerly included in the genus. A molecular phylogenetic study published in 2011 found that the chestnut-headed tesia was embedded in a clade containing members of the genus Cettia. The species was therefore moved but retained the same common name.

== Range and diversity ==
The genus has a disjunct distribution in South and South East Asia. The three northern species range widely across southern China, Burma, Northern Thailand and Laos and into India, southern Nepal and Vietnam; whereas the other two species are found in Java and the Lesser Sundas in southern Indonesia. The russet-capped tesia was once considered to be a race of the Timor stubtail, Urosphena subulata. The three northern species are sometimes known as ground-warblers.

== Description ==
Tesias are tiny ground-living warblers which range in length from 7 to 10 cm and weigh between 6 and 12 g. They have long legs and an upright stance, and appear to almost lack a tail, as their tail rectrices are shorter than the tail coverts. The plumage of the northern species is olive backs and wings and grey bellies (darker slate in the slaty-bellied tesia); the southern species have brown wings and backs. All species have an eye-stripe and all except the slaty-bellied tesia have a supercilium; this is most prominent in the Javan tesia. The plumage of the chestnut-headed tesia is different from the other species; it has a bright yellow belly, chest and throat, and a deep chestnut coloured head and an incomplete white orbital ring. It lacks the facial stripes of the other species. The bill of all species is long and bicoloured, with a dark upper mandible and a flesh-coloured lower one, as well as strong ridge on the upper mandible.

== Habits ==
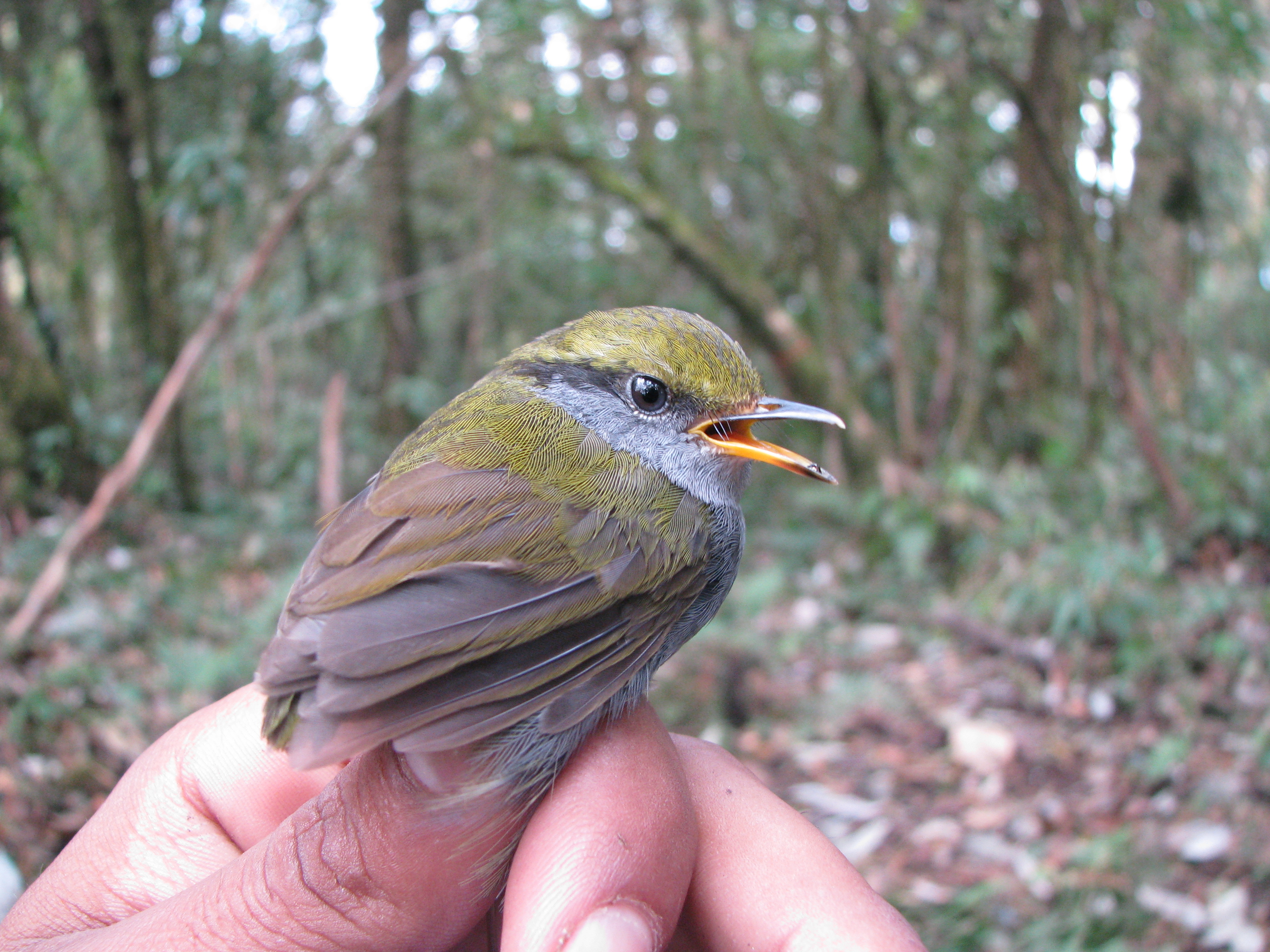
Grey-bellied tesia in India

Tesias live in the undergrowth of forest, usually montane broadleaf forest. They have a preference for damp forest, and are often found near water, particularly the Chestnut-headed and slaty-bellied tesias, although they use a range of microhabitats within the forest, including patches of bamboo or nettles. The three northern species are altitudinal migrants, breeding up to 4,000 m but wintering as low as 150 m. The two southern species are resident within their range.

The tesias are active insectivores that usually feed near the ground amongst the undergrowth and leaf litter, but may forage as high as 25 m off the ground (in the case of the russet-capped tesia) amongst the tangle of creepers on large tree trunks. The slaty-bellied tesia will move leaves around in the manner of a thrush while foraging, and the grey-bellied tesia has been recorded joining mixed-species feeding flocks in the non-breeding season.

== Breeding ==
There is little information about the breeding biology of the tesias, only three species, the Grey-bellied, Chestnut-headed and Javan, have even had their nests described. They are seasonal breeders, with the Grey-bellied and russet-capped tesias nesting in May–July, and the Javan tesia having two seasons, April–June and October to December. The nest is a ball of moss for the grey-bellied tesia and plant fibres, moss and roots, and is fixed into vegetation or moss on the side of a tree, low down. The clutch size of the grey-bellied tesia is 3-5 eggs, but only 2 eggs for the Javan tesia and chestnut-headed tesia. In the chestnut-headed tesia both sexes incubate the clutch; this species is also known to occasionally be parasitized by the lesser cuckoo.

== Status ==
None of the tesias are considered to be threatened by human activities, and are all listed as least concern by the IUCN. Even the island species, which have restricted ranges, are described as common within their ranges.

== Species ==
The four species are:

Image	Common name	Scientific name	Distribution
	Slaty-bellied tesia	Tesia olivea	Bhutan to north Vietnam
	Grey-bellied tesia	Tesia cyaniventer	north India to south Vietnam
	Javan tesia	Tesia superciliaris	west Java, Indonesia
	Russet-capped tesia	Tesia everetti	Sumbawa & Flores islands, east Indonesia
