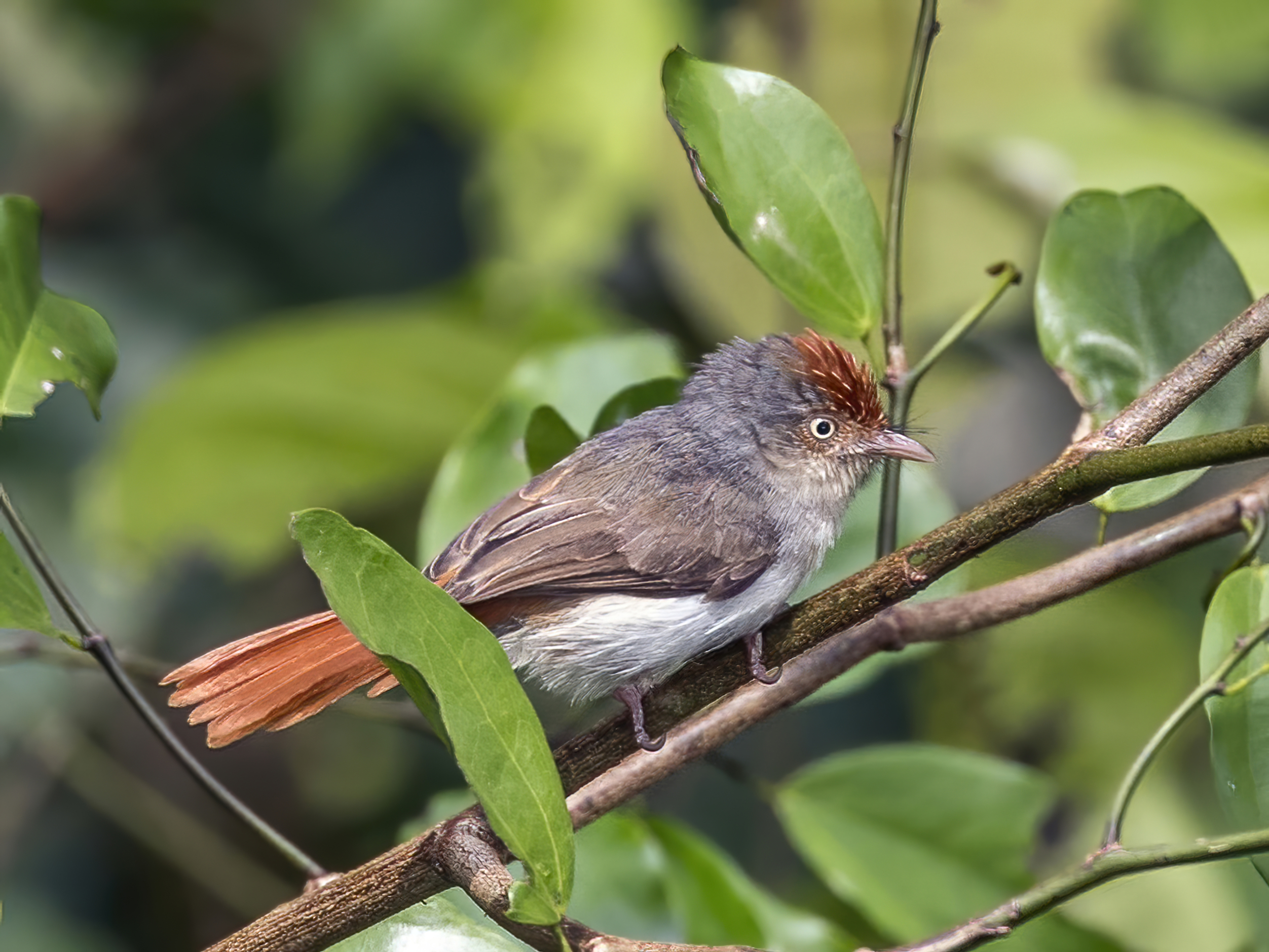
- Chestnut-capped flycatcher E. mccallii nigeriae

Scientific classification
- Kingdom: Animalia
- Phylum: Chordata
- Class: Aves
- Order: Passeriformes
- Superfamily: Aegithaloidea
- Family: Erythrocercidae; Fregin, Haase, Olsson & Alström, 2012
- Genus: Erythrocercus; Hartlaub, 1857

Type species
- Pycnophrys mccallii Cassin, 1855

= Erythrocercus =

Genus of birds

Erythrocercus is a genus of birds containing three flycatchers that are found in Africa.

The genus is placed in its own family Erythrocercidae that was introduced by Silke Fregin and collaborators in 2012.

- - Aegithaloidea
    - - Phylloscopidae – leaf warblers (80 species)
      - - Hyliidae – hylias (2 species)
        - - Aegithalidae – bushtits (13 species)
          - - Erythrocercidae – flycatchers (3 species)
            - - Scotocercidae – streaked scrub warbler
              - Cettiidae – bush warblers and allies (32 species)

Cladogram showing the family relationships based on a study by Carl Oliveros and colleagues published in 2019. The number of species is taken from the bird list maintained by Frank Gill, Pamela Rasmussen and David Donsker on behalf of the International Ornithological Committee (IOC).

== Species ==
The genus contains the following species:

Image	Common name	Scientific name	Distribution
	Little yellow flycatcher	Erythrocercus holochlorus	Kenya, Somalia, and Tanzania.
	Livingstone's flycatcher	Erythrocercus livingstonei	Malawi, Mozambique, Tanzania, Zambia, and Zimbabwe.
	Chestnut-capped flycatcher	Erythrocercus mccallii	Angola, Cameroon, Central African Republic, Republic of the Congo, Democratic Republic of the Congo, Ivory Coast, Equatorial Guinea, Gabon, Ghana, Guinea, Liberia, Mali, Nigeria, Sierra Leone, and Uganda.
