= Aegithaloidea =

Scientific classification
- Kingdom: Animalia
- Phylum: Chordata
- Class: Aves
- Order: Passeriformes
- Suborder: Passeri
- Infraorder: Passerides
- Parvorder: Sylviida
- Superfamily: Aegithaloidea

Families
- See text

Superfamily of birds

Aegithaloidea is a superfamily of birds in the Passeriformes.

== Systematics ==
Aegithaloidea contains the following families:

- Hyliidae
- Aegithalidae
- Erythrocercidae
- Cettiidae
- Phylloscopidae
