= Francesco Cetti =

Italian Jesuit priest, zoologist and mathematician (1726–1778)

Francesco Cetti SJ
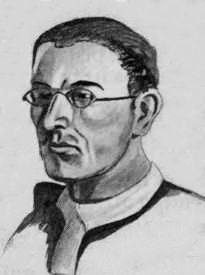
- Francesco Cetti
- Born: 9 August 1726; Mannheim, Electorate of the Palatinate
- Died: 20 November 1778 (aged 52); Sassari, Kingdom of Sardinia
- Known for: Storia Naturale di Sardegna (Natural History of Sardinia) (1774–1777)
- Scientific career
- Fields: Mathematics; Zoology; Natural history
- Workplaces: University of Sassari

Francesco Cetti SJ (9 August 1726 – 20 November 1778) was an Italian Jesuit priest, zoologist and mathematician.

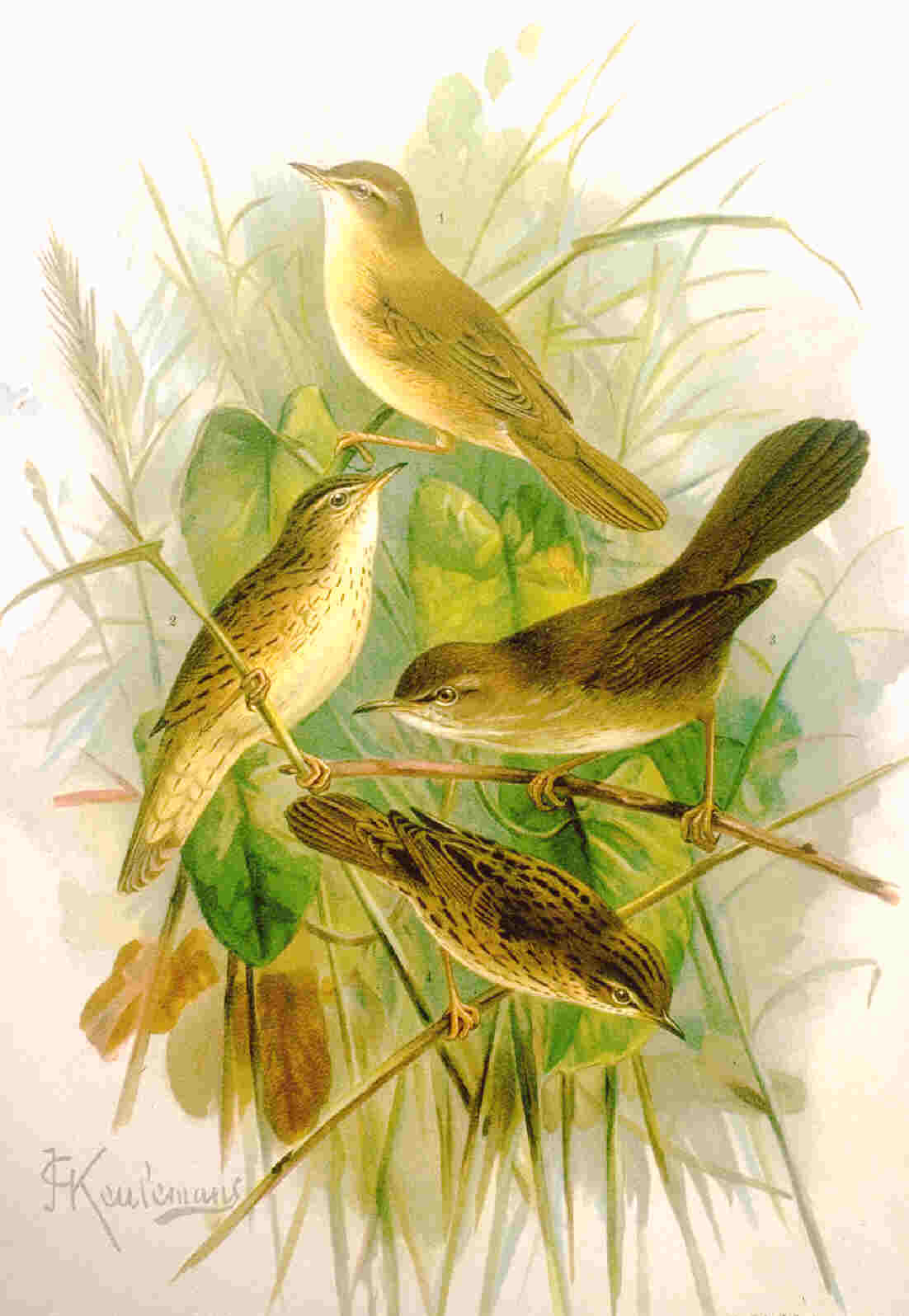
Cetti's warbler

== Early life and education ==
Cetti was born in Mannheim in Germany, but his parents were natives of Como. He was educated in Lombardy and at the Jesuit college at Monza.

== Career ==
He entered the Jesuit novitiate in Milan on 12 October 1742, and professed the four vows on 2 February 1760. He devoted himself to scientific studies and taught for several years philosophy and mathematics at the Jesuit College of Brera, soon becoming one of the most prominent members of the Milanese province.

In 1765, he was sent to Sardinia to help improve the standard of education on the island. In 1766, he was appointed to the Chair of Mathematics at the University of Sassari, holding that position until his death.

Cetti took long excursions in the vicinity of Sassari, collating his discoveries in the Storia Naturale di Sardegna (Natural History of Sardinia, 1774–7). This has three volumes, covering mammals, birds and amphibians with fishes. A supplement on mammals was published in 1777.

== Legacy ==
Cetti is commemorated in the name of the Cetti's warbler (Cettia cetti), which was collected on Sardinia by Alberto della Marmora.

== Works ==
- Cetti, Francesco (1774). Storia Naturale di Sardegna (in Italian). Vol. 1: I Quadrupedi di Sardegna. Sassari: G. Piattoli.
- Cetti, Francesco (1776). Storia Naturale di Sardegna (in Italian). Vol. 2: Gli Uccelli di Sardegna. Sassari: G. Piattoli.
- Cetti, Francesco (1777). Storia Naturale di Sardegna (in Italian). Vol. 3: Anfibi e Pesci di Sardegna. Sassari: G. Piattoli.
- Cetti, Francesco (1777). Appendice alla storia naturale dei quadrupedi di Sardegna (in Italian). Sassari: G. Piattoli.
