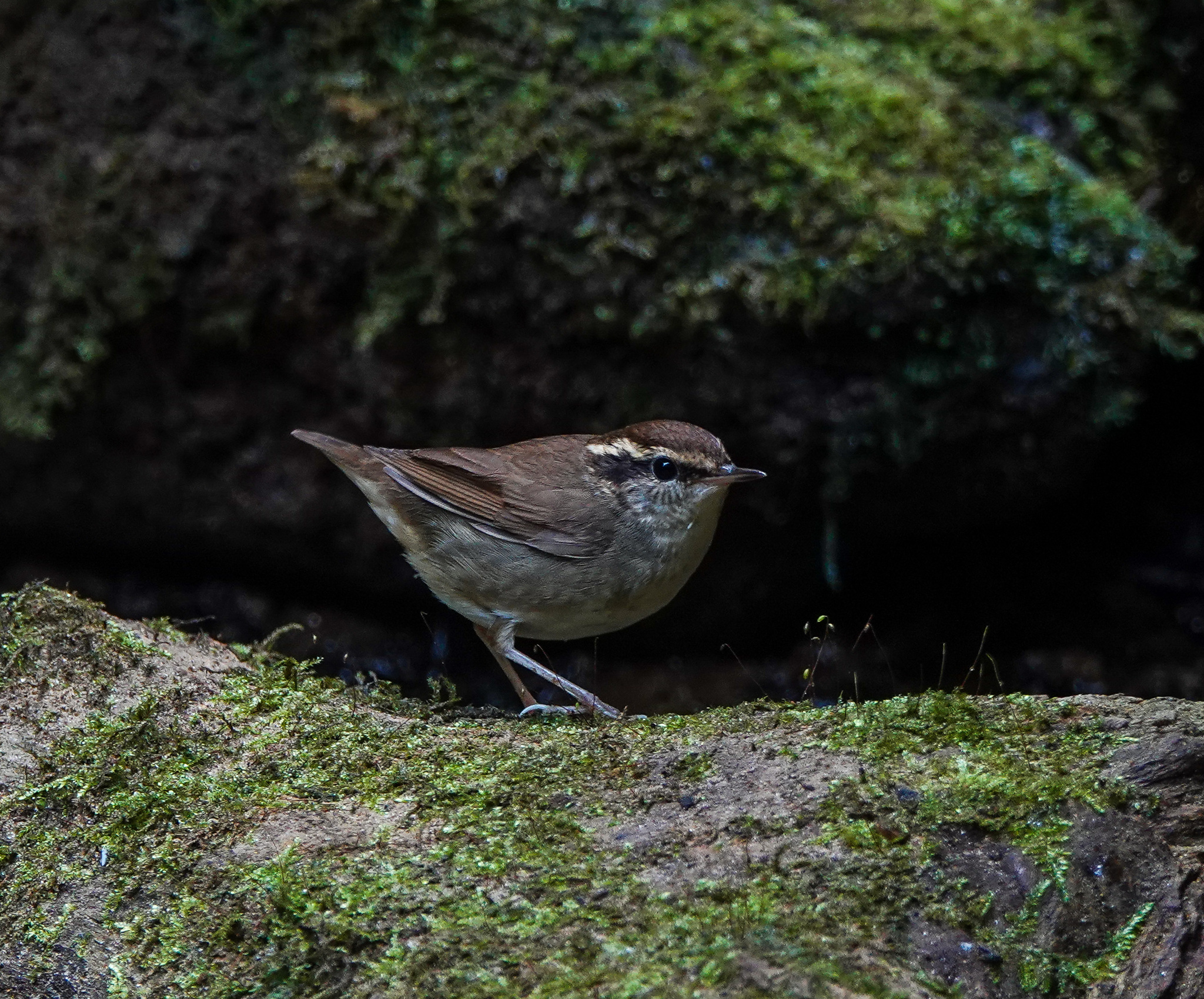

Conservation status
- Least Concern (IUCN 3.1)

Scientific classification
- Kingdom: Animalia
- Phylum: Chordata
- Class: Aves
- Order: Passeriformes
- Family: Cettiidae
- Genus: Urosphena
- Species: U. squameiceps

Binomial name
- Urosphena squameiceps (R. Swinhoe, 1863)

= Asian stubtail =

Species of bird

The Asian stubtail (Urosphena squameiceps) is a bird in the family Cettiidae. The species was first described by Robert Swinhoe in 1863. It breeds in Northeast Asia and Japan. Its natural habitat is temperate forest.

== Description ==
It is a small bird with a short tail. Males and females are similar in color, as well as juveniles after fledging; they are brown all over with a paler underpart and a darker brown crest and eyeline.

== Distribution and habitat ==
Breeding Asian stubtails reside in portions of northeastern Asia; non-breeding areas include Hainan Taiwan, southeastern China and Indochina, preferring a habitat of undergrowth in evergreen broadleaf or lowland coniferous forest.

== Behavior ==
=== Voice ===
Breeding males produce a high-pitched shee-shee-shee-shee or cee-cee-cee, while both males and females make a call similar to chott-chott-chott.
