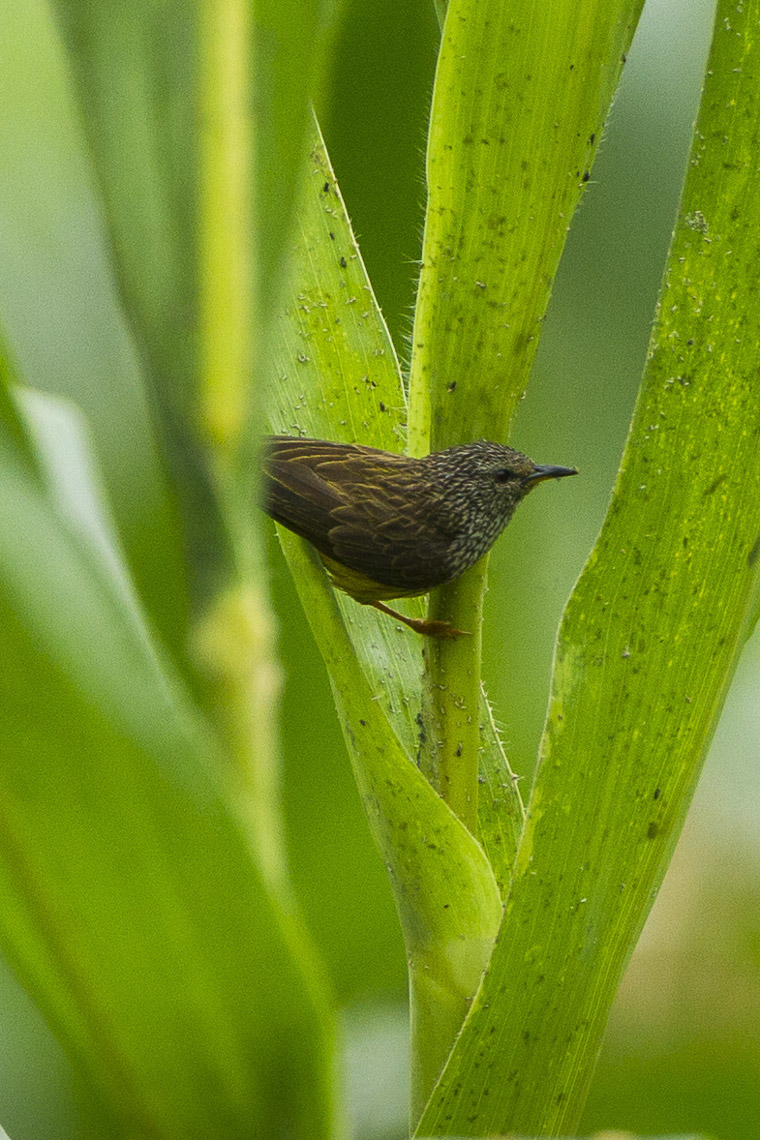

Conservation status
- Least Concern (IUCN 3.1)

Scientific classification
- Kingdom: Animalia
- Phylum: Chordata
- Class: Aves
- Order: Passeriformes
- Superfamily: Aegithaloidea
- Family: Hyliidae
- Genus: Pholidornis; Hartlaub, 1857
- Species: P. rushiae

Binomial name
- Pholidornis rushiae (Cassin, 1855)

= Tit hylia =

Species of bird

The tit hylia (Pholidornis rushiae) is a species of bird, monotypic within the genus Pholidornis. It is found in rainforests in West and Central Africa. It had been placed in the family Cettiidae, but in 2019 its assignment to a new family, the Hyliidae, was strongly supported.

== Taxonomy ==
The tit hylia was described by John Cassin in 1855 as Diceum Rushiæ based on a specimen collected from present-day Gabon. It was placed in the genus Pholidornis by Gustav Hartlaub two years later. Its generic name is derived from the Ancient Greek pholidos for scale and ornis for bird.

== Distribution and habitat ==
It is widespread across the African tropical rainforest.

== Description ==
At 8 cm (3.1 in) long, it is perhaps the smallest bird native to Africa. This species has a pale buff chest and head overlaid with heavy brown streaking. From the lower breast down to the rump, this bird is bright yellow. The legs are a bright orange color. Juveniles are less colorful and less heavily streaked. Due to its small size it sometimes gets trapped in spider webs.

== Behaviour ==
=== Feeding ===
The tit hylia is a bird of the upper and middle canopy, usually foraging from 5–15 m (16–49 ft) from the forest floor and rarely coming lower. It is social, feeding in small flocks of up to seven birds (although very rarely with other species). It feeds on insects, with scale insects (family Coccoidea) being an important part of the diet.

=== Breeding ===
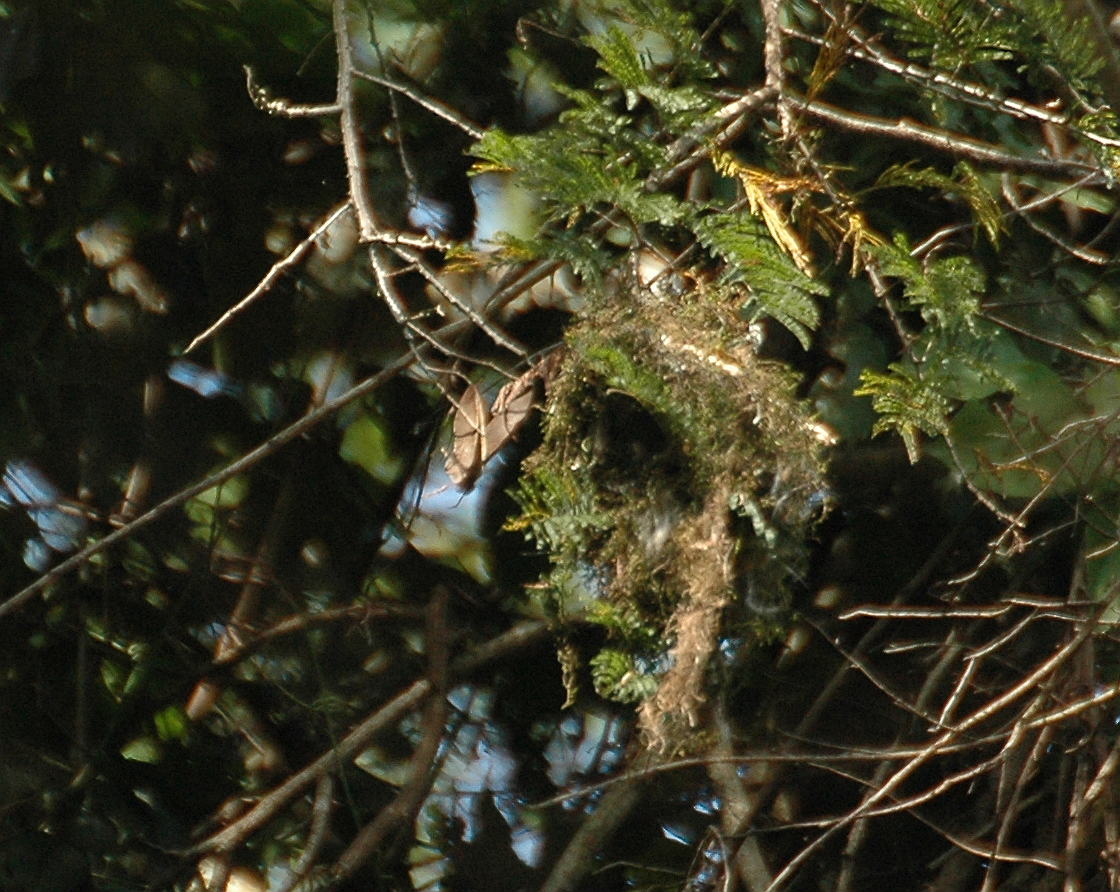
Nest photographed at Mabira Forest, Uganda Jan 2006.

The tit hylia is a monogamous breeder, and a report from Angola has suggested that it may engage in cooperative breeding as well. The round nest, built by the pair or group, is large, 15 cm (5.9 in) across, and is made of plant fibres. The entrance is a spout hanging from the bottom. The nest is situated 3–20 m (9.8–65.6 ft) up a tree. The nests are well made and strongly bound to the branches they are found on. Two eggs are laid, although there is no information about the incubation, up to four adults have been reported feeding the chicks, and the nest is used for roosting after the breeding season.
