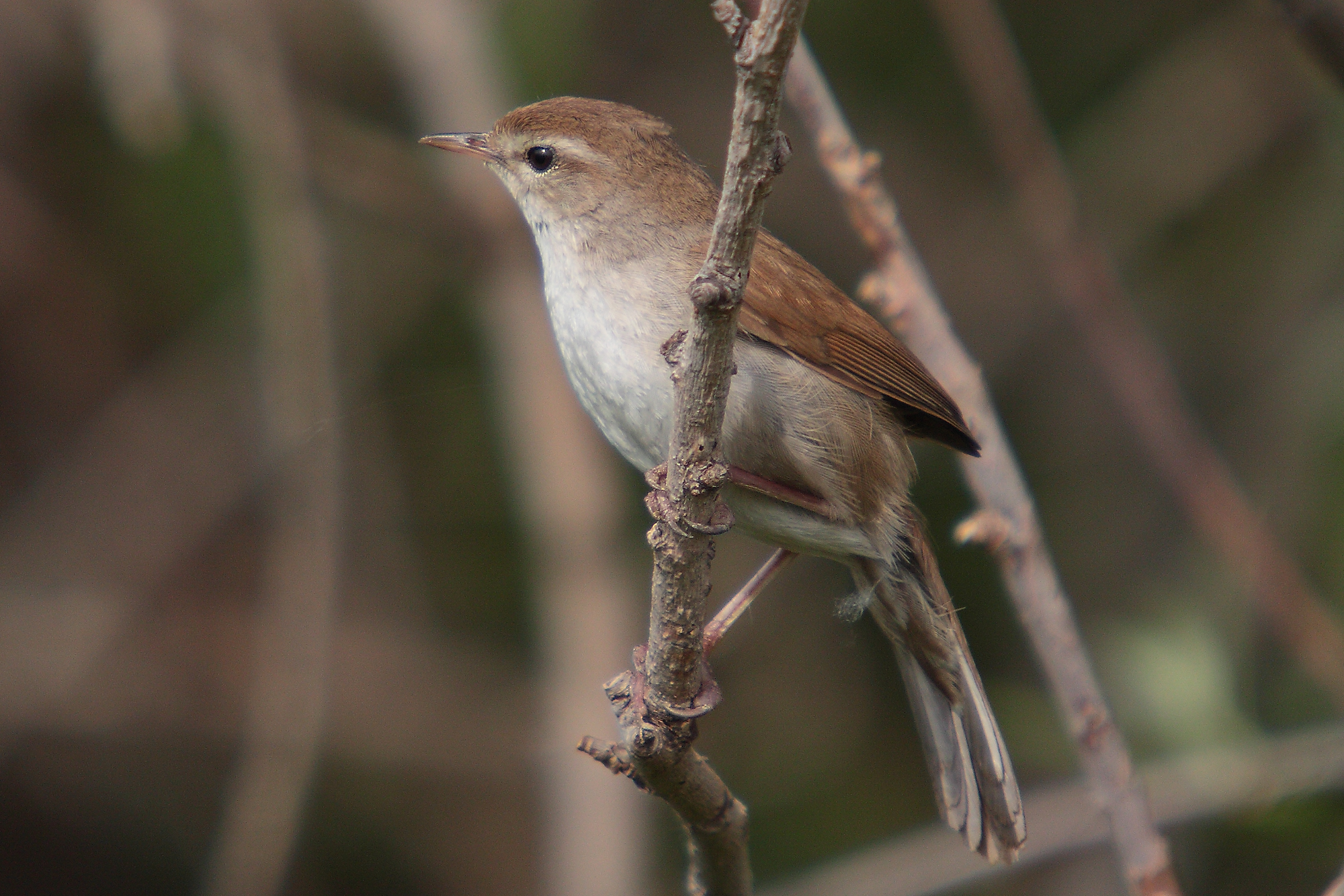
- Cetti's warbler (Cettia cetti)

Scientific classification
- Kingdom: Animalia
- Phylum: Chordata
- Class: Aves
- Order: Passeriformes
- Family: Cettiidae
- Genus: Cettia; Bonaparte, 1834

Type species
- Sylvia cetti Marmora, 1820

Species
- 4, but see text

= Cettia =

Genus of birds

Cettia /ˈtʃɛtiːə/ is a genus of small insectivorous songbirds ("warblers") which make up the core of the newly recognized family Cettiidae. They were formerly placed in the Sylviidae, which at that time was a wastebin taxon for the warbler-like Sylvioidea. The range of this genus extends from Europe to southeast Asia.

The genus gets its name from the Cetti's warbler, itself named after the 18th century Italian zoologist Francesco Cetti.

The cettiid or typical bush warblers share the lifestyle and related adaptations and apomorphies with Bradypterus, the other genus called bush warblers. However, Bradypterus is related to the grass warblers of Locustella and Megalurus and is more distant from Cettia. Both "bush warbler" genera are smallish birds well adapted to climbing among shrubbery. They are markedly long-tailed birds, at first glance somewhat reminiscent of wrens.

These are quite terrestrial birds, which live in densely vegetated habitats such as thick forest and reedbeds. They will walk away from disturbance rather than flush. The plumage similarities and skulking lifestyle makes these birds hard to see and identify.

Cettid bush warblers tend towards rich or greyish browns above and buffish or light grey tones below. They have little patterning apart from the ubiquitous supercilium. Altogether, they appear much like the plainer species among Acrocephalus marsh warblers in coloration. Megalurid bush warblers tend to be somewhat slimmer and have a very long and pointed tail, but are otherwise very similar.

== Taxonomy ==
The genus Cettia was erected in 1834 by the French ornithologist Charles Lucien Bonaparte to accommodate Cetti's warbler (Cettia cetti). The specific epithet cetti had been chosen in 1820 by Coenraad Jacob Temminck to commemorate the Italian zoologist Francesco Cetti.

The phylogenetic relationships among the Cettia species are shown below, based on the data by the Cornell Lab of Ornithology.

- Cettia
  - - Chestnut-headed tesia, C. castaneocoronata
    - Chestnut-crowned bush warbler, C. major
  - - Grey-sided bush warbler, C. brunnifrons
    - Cetti's warbler, C. cetti

This genus and the genus Horornis have been split. Cetti's warbler (C. cetti), the type species, seems close to the genus Tesia from Southeast Asia and neighboring regions. Species in the genus Horornis, such as the famous uguisu (鶯, Japanese bush warbler, H. diphone) and the brown-flanked bush warbler (H. fortipes) belong to a group that might include the aberrant broad-billed warbler (Tickellia hodgsoni). This latter species differs wildly in its gaudy colors but in habitus is a typical "bush warbler".

| Image | Common name | Scientific name | Distribution |
|---|---|---|---|
| | Chestnut-crowned bush warbler | Cettia major | South Asia |
| | Chestnut-headed tesia | Cettia castaneocoronata | Bangladesh, Bhutan, China, India, Laos, Myanmar, Nepal, Thailand, and Vietnam. |
| | Grey-sided bush warbler | Cettia brunnifrons | northern Pakistan to central China. |
| | Cetti's warbler | Cettia cetti | southern and central Europe, northwest Africa and the east Palearctic as far as Afghanistan and northwest Pakistan. |
