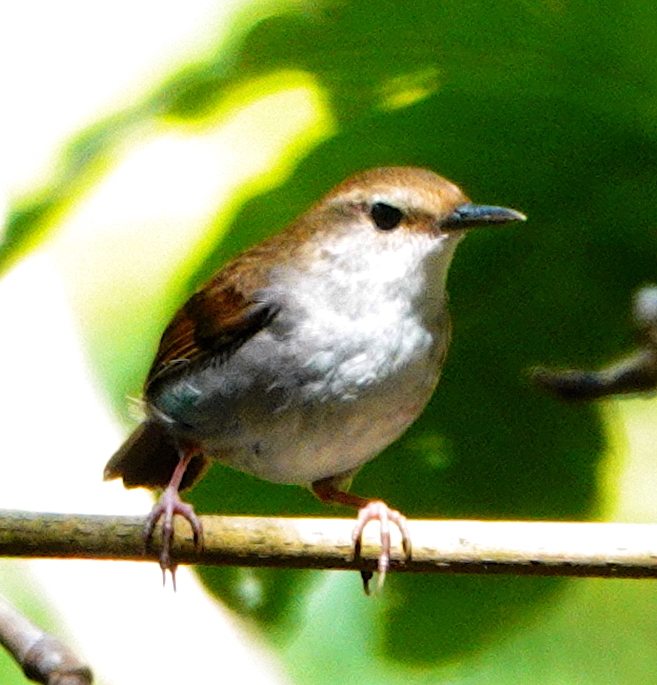

Conservation status
- Least Concern (IUCN 3.1)

Scientific classification
- Kingdom: Animalia
- Phylum: Chordata
- Class: Aves
- Order: Passeriformes
- Family: Cettiidae
- Genus: Urosphena
- Species: U. subulata

Binomial name
- Urosphena subulata (Sharpe, 1884)

= Timor stubtail =

Species of bird

The Timor stubtail (Urosphena subulata) is a species of bird in the family Cettiidae. It is found on Timor and northern and eastern adjacent islands.
