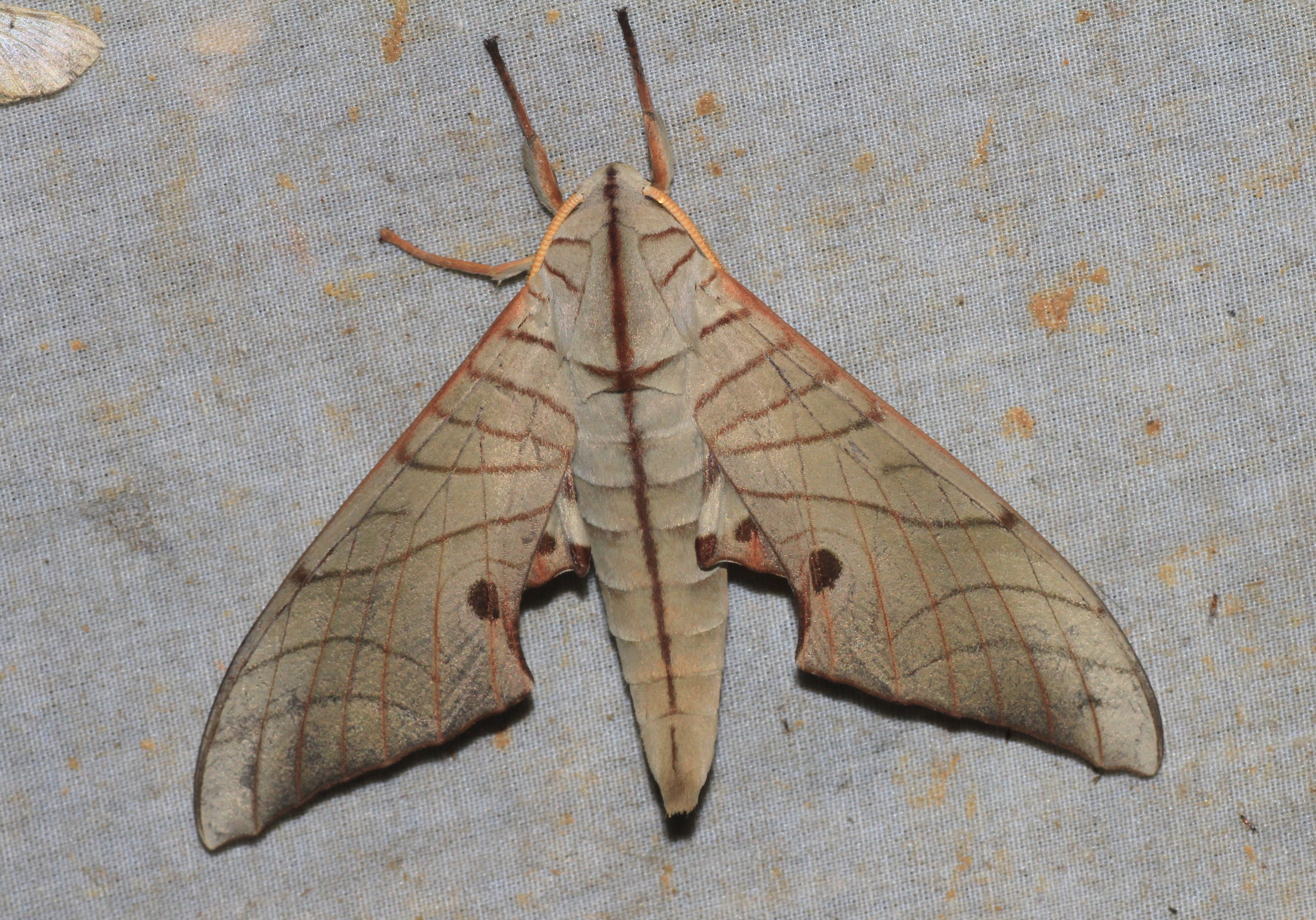

Scientific classification
- Domain: Eukaryota
- Kingdom: Animalia
- Phylum: Arthropoda
- Class: Insecta
- Order: Lepidoptera
- Family: Sphingidae
- Genus: Marumba
- Species: M. juvencus

Binomial name
- Marumba juvencus Rothschild & Jordan, 1912

Synonyms
- Marumba juvencus brunea (Diehl, 1982)

= Marumba juvencus =

Species of moth

Marumba juvencus is a species of moth of the family Sphingidae first described by Walter Rothschild and Karl Jordan in 1912.

== Distribution ==
It is known from Peninsular Malaysia, Sumatra and Borneo. The habitat consists of lowland forests

== Description ==
The species is very similar to Marumba sperchius and Marumba tigrina .

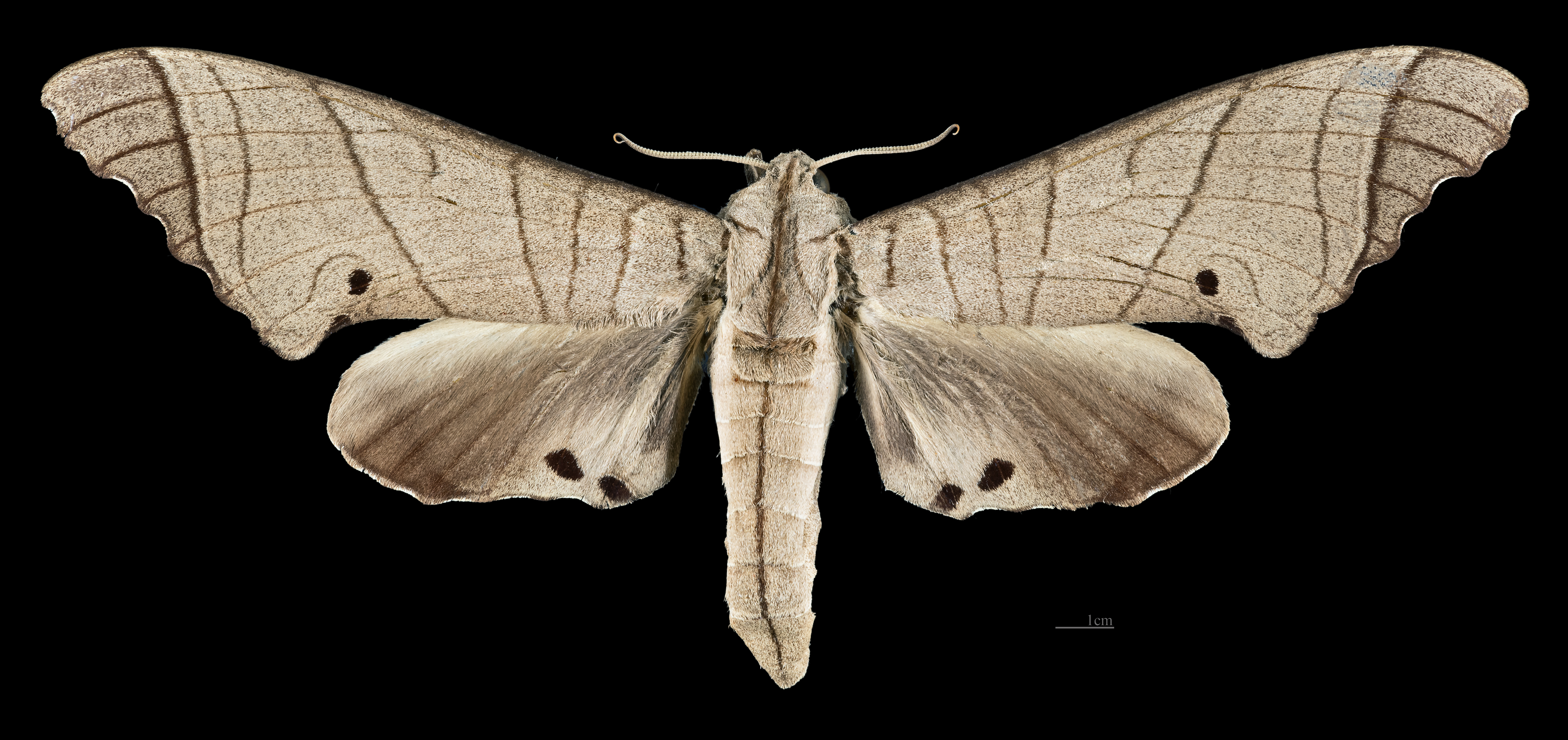
Male, dorsal view

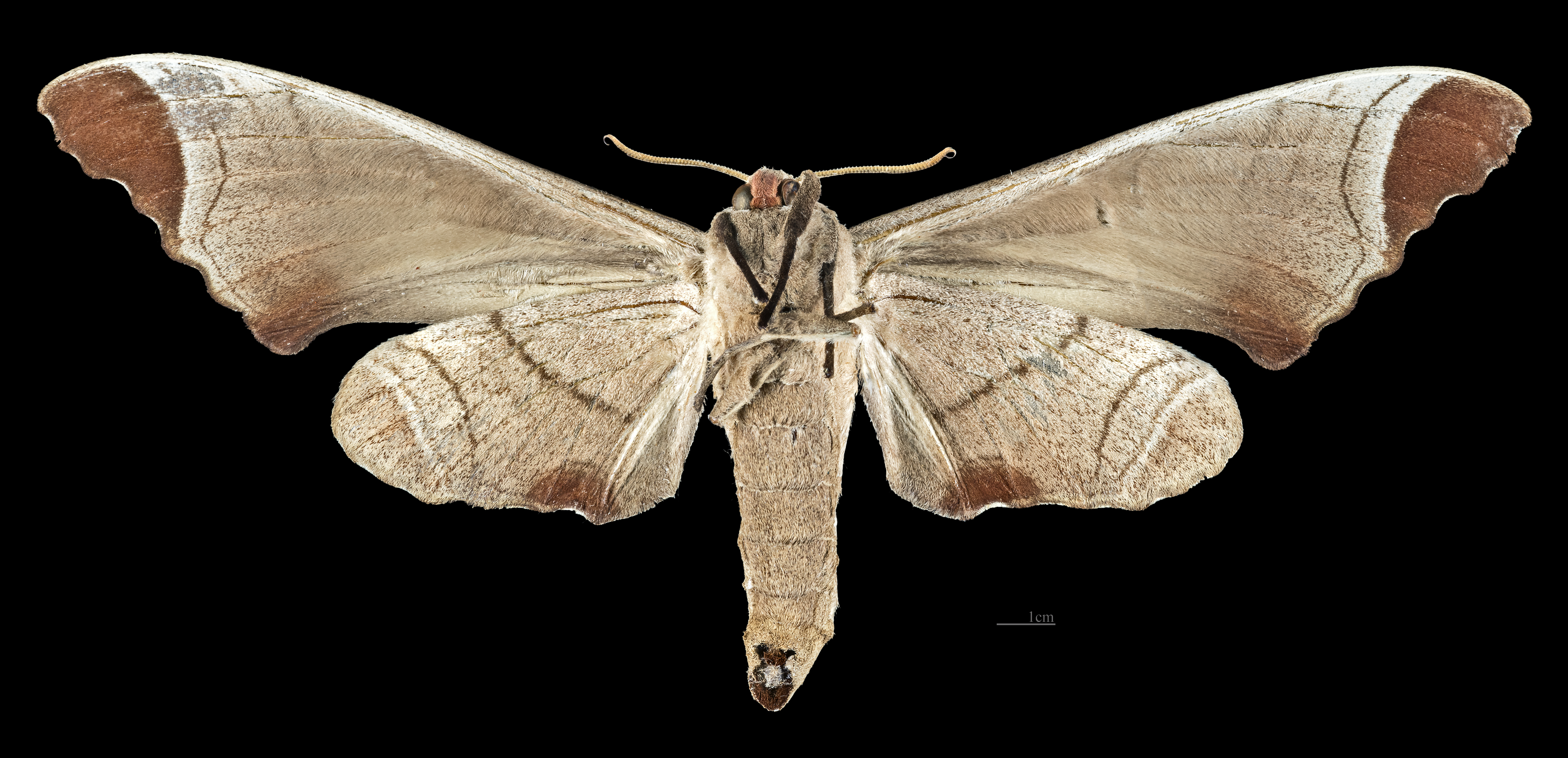
Male, ventral view
