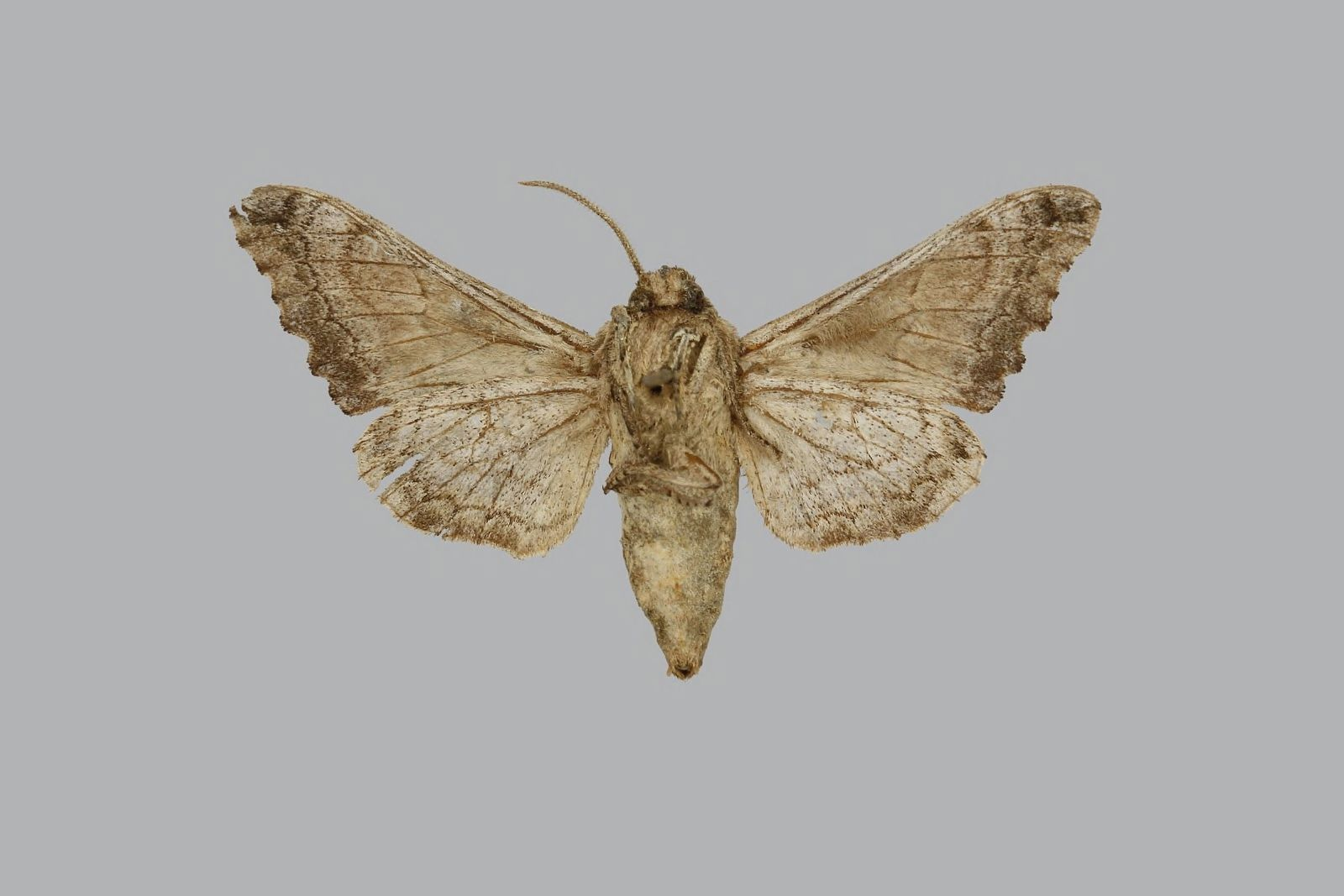
- Marumba poliotis male underside

Scientific classification
- Domain: Eukaryota
- Kingdom: Animalia
- Phylum: Arthropoda
- Class: Insecta
- Order: Lepidoptera
- Family: Sphingidae
- Genus: Marumba
- Species: M. poliotis

Binomial name
- Marumba poliotis Hampson, 1907

= Marumba poliotis =

Species of moth

Marumba poliotis is a species of moth of the family Sphingidae. It is known from India.

It is a small, grey species. There are shades of pale grey and pale brown on the forewing upperside, crossed by crenulated and irregular transverse lines.
