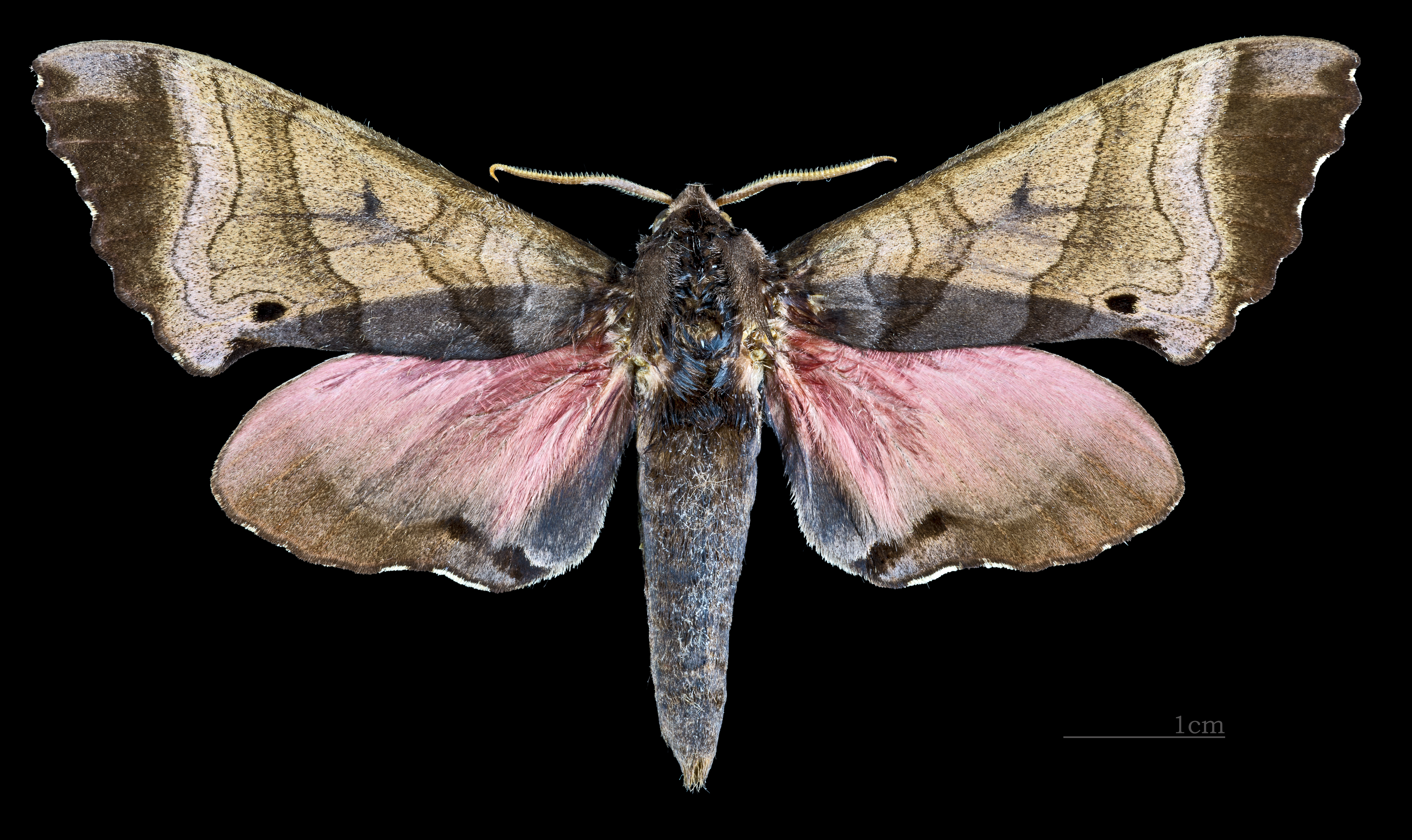
- Marumba gaschkewitschii

Scientific classification
- Domain: Eukaryota
- Kingdom: Animalia
- Phylum: Arthropoda
- Class: Insecta
- Order: Lepidoptera
- Family: Sphingidae
- Tribe: Smerinthini
- Genus: Marumba; Moore, 1882

Synonyms
- Burrowsia Tutt, 1902; Kayeia Tutt, 1902; Sichia Tutt, 1902

= Marumba =

Genus of moths

Marumba is a genus of moths in the family Sphingidae first described by Frederic Moore in 1882.

== Species ==
- Marumba amboinicus (C. Felder, 1861)
- Marumba cristata (Butler, 1875)
- Marumba diehli Roesler & Kuppers, 1975
- Marumba dyras (Walker, 1865)
- Marumba fenzelii Mell, 1937
- Marumba gaschkewitschii (Bremer & Grey, 1853)
- Marumba indicus (Walker, 1856)
- Marumba jankowskii (Oberthur, 1880)
- Marumba juvencus Rothschild & Jordan, 1912
- Marumba maackii (Bremer, 1861)
- Marumba nympha (Rothschild & Jordan, 1903)
- Marumba poliotis Hampson, 1907
- Marumba quercus (Denis & Schiffermuller, 1775)
- Marumba saishiuana Okamoto, 1924
- Marumba spectabilis (Butler, 1875)
- Marumba sperchius (Menetries, 1857)
- Marumba tigrina Gehlen, 1936
- Marumba timora (Rothschild & Jordan, 1903)

== Gallery ==
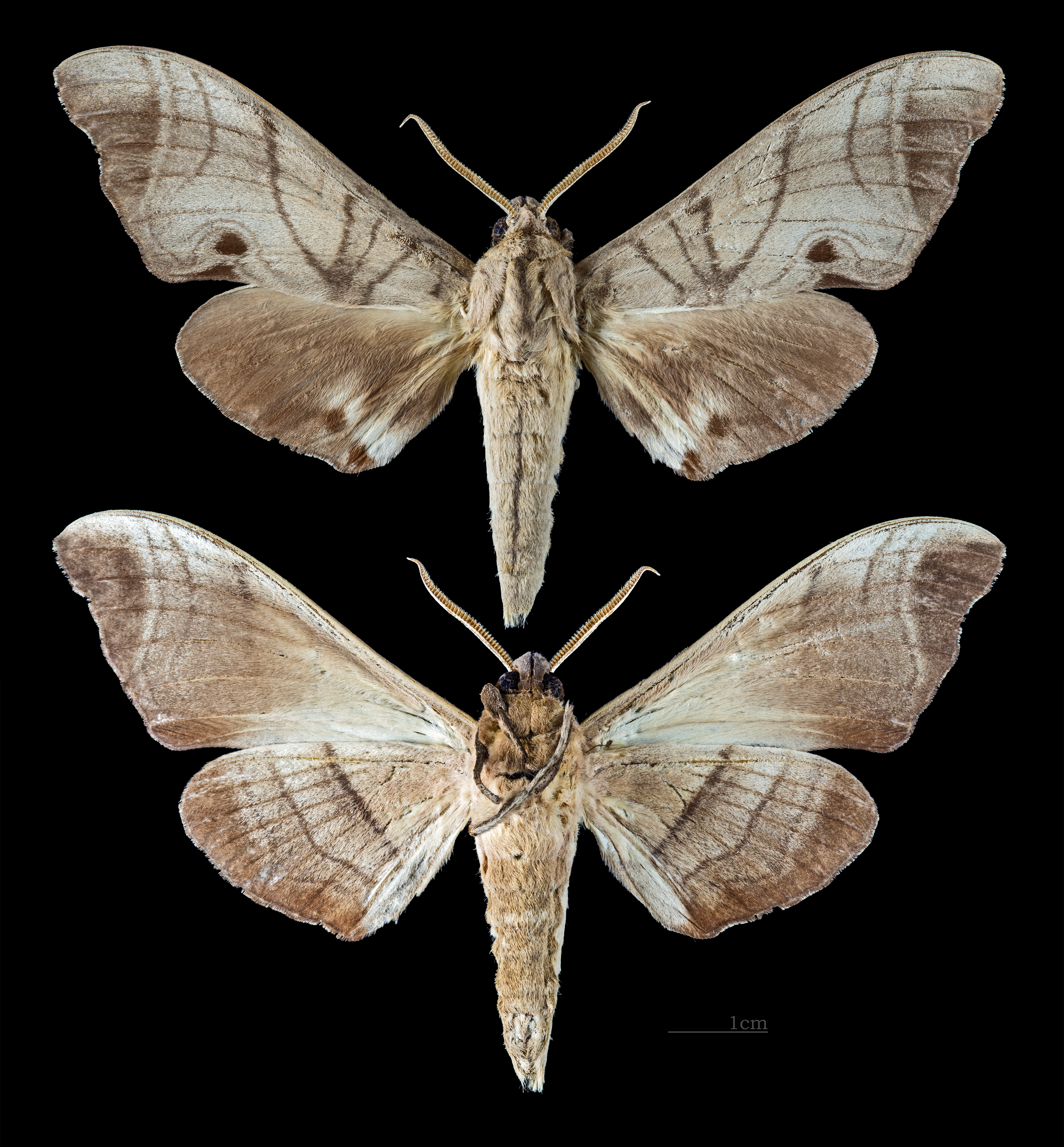
Marumba amboinicus

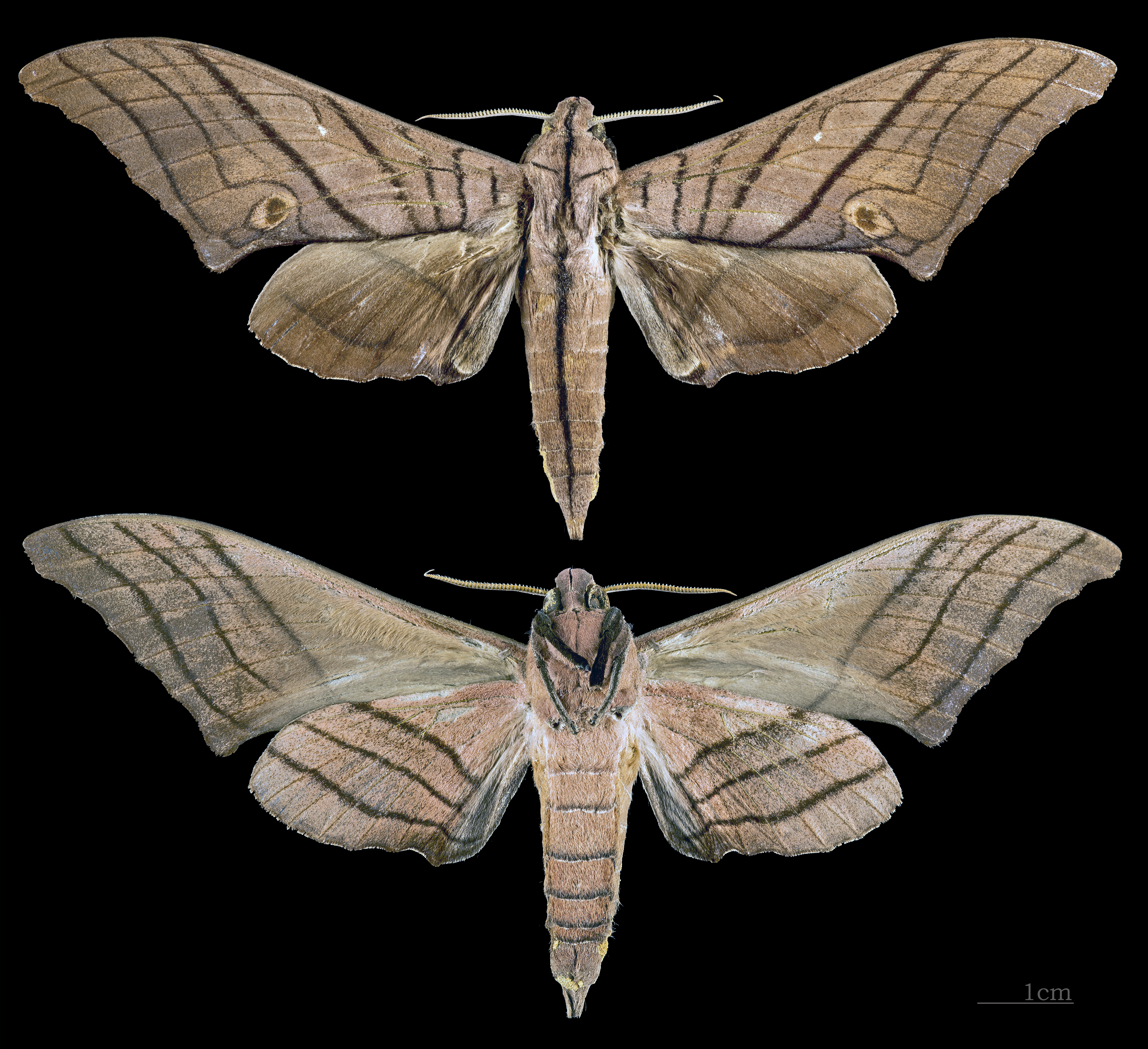
Marumba cristata

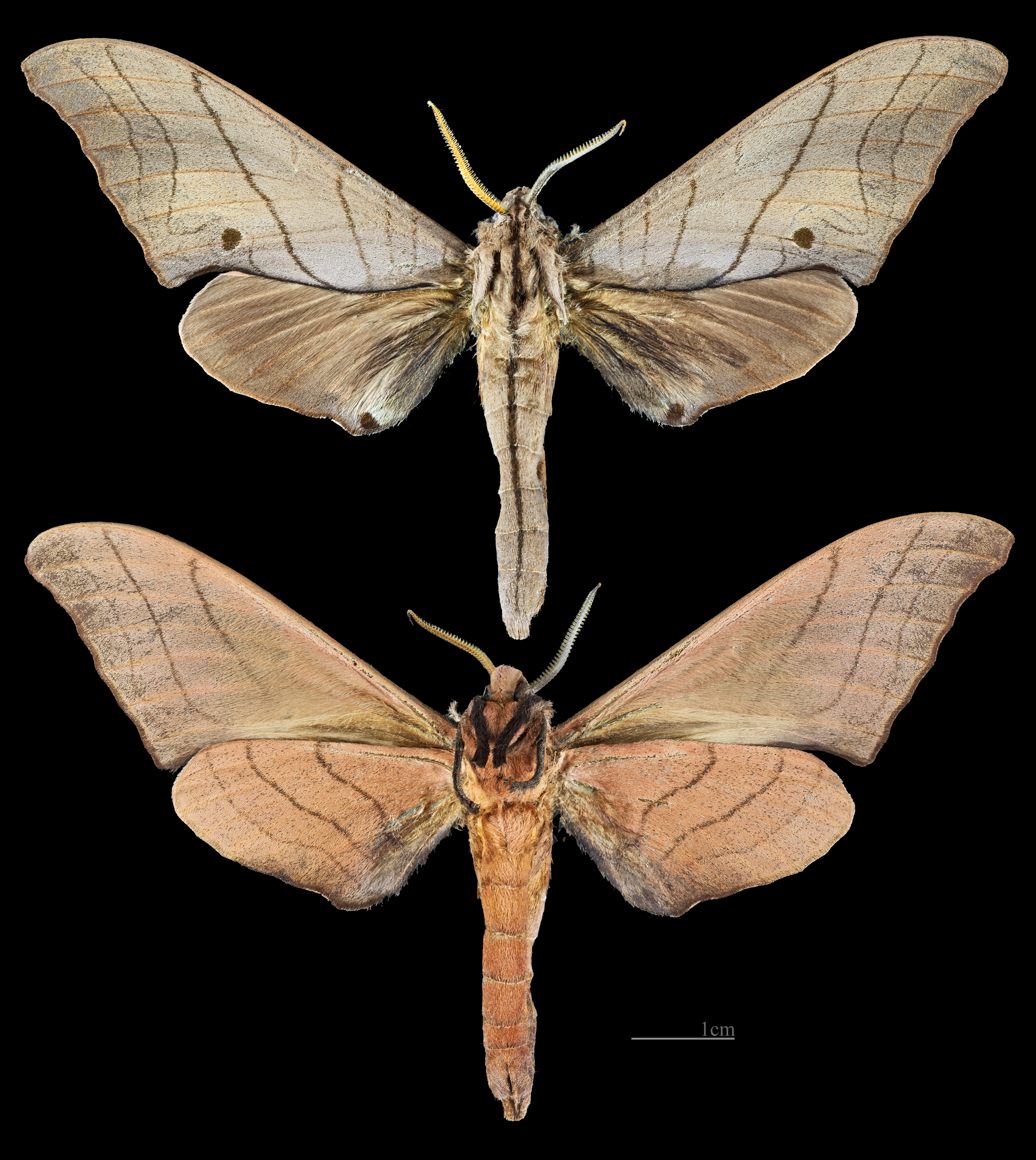
Marumba diehli

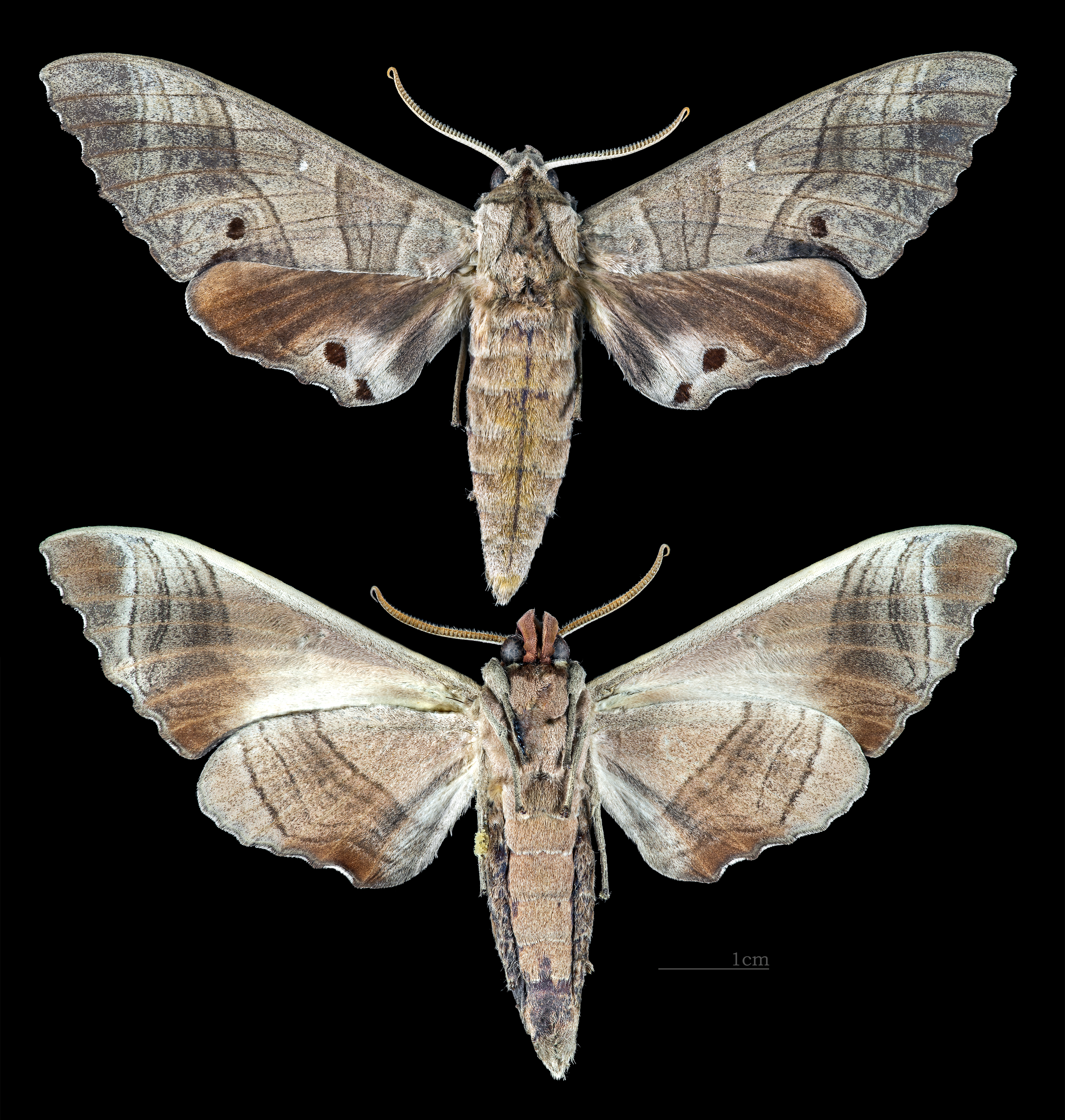
Marumba dyras

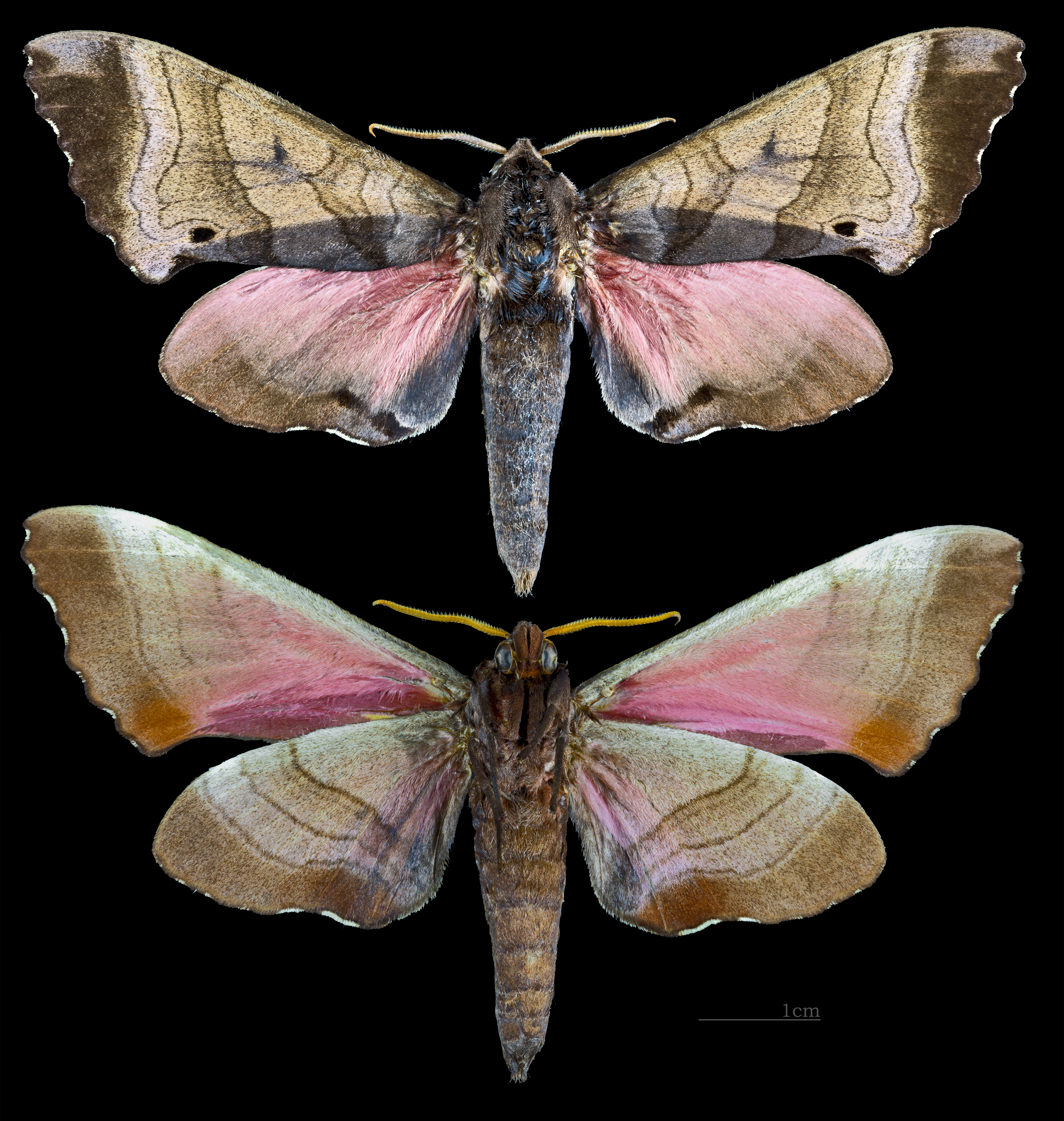
Marumba gaschkewitschii

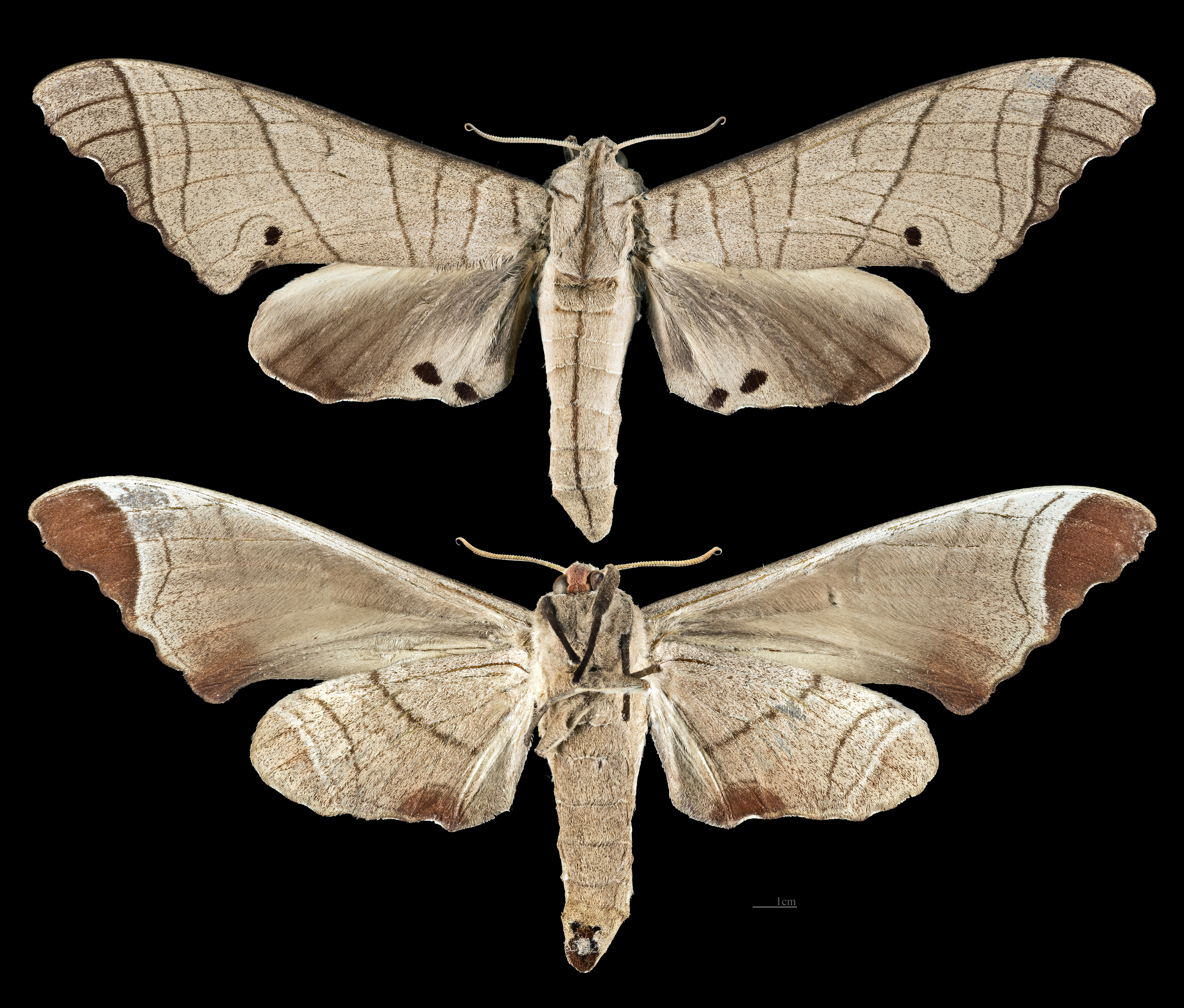
Marumba juvencus

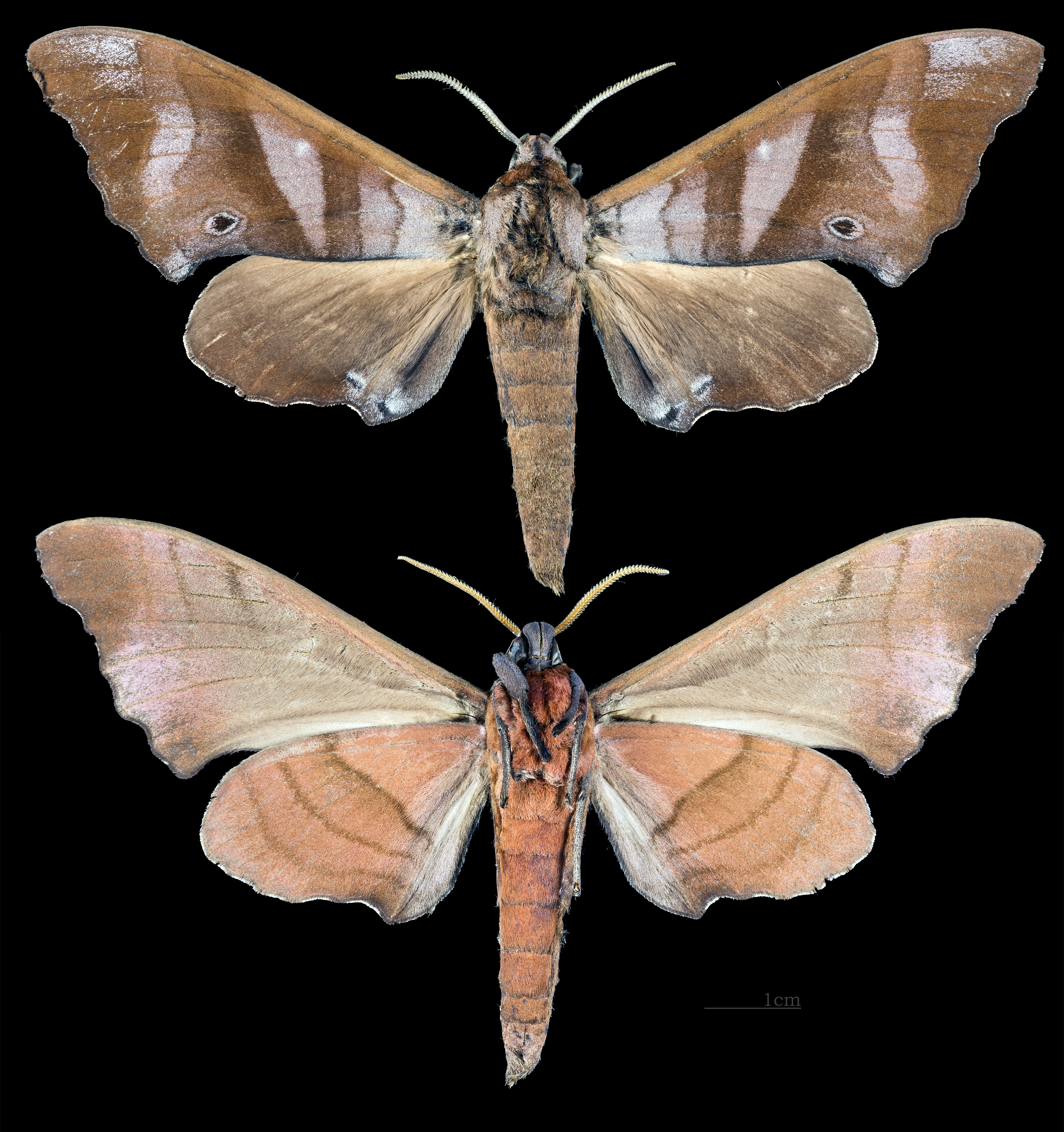
Marumba nympha

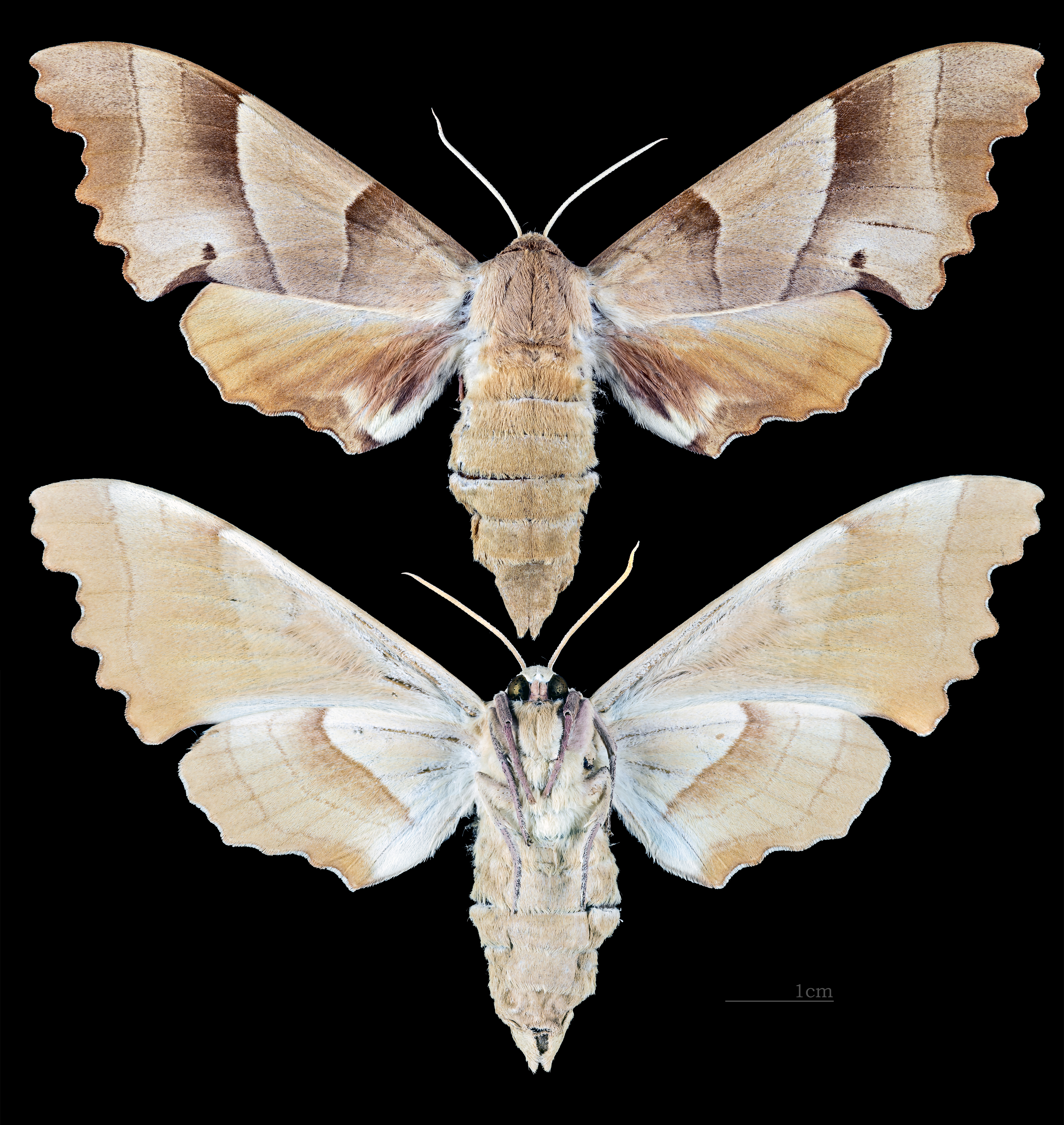
Marumba quercus

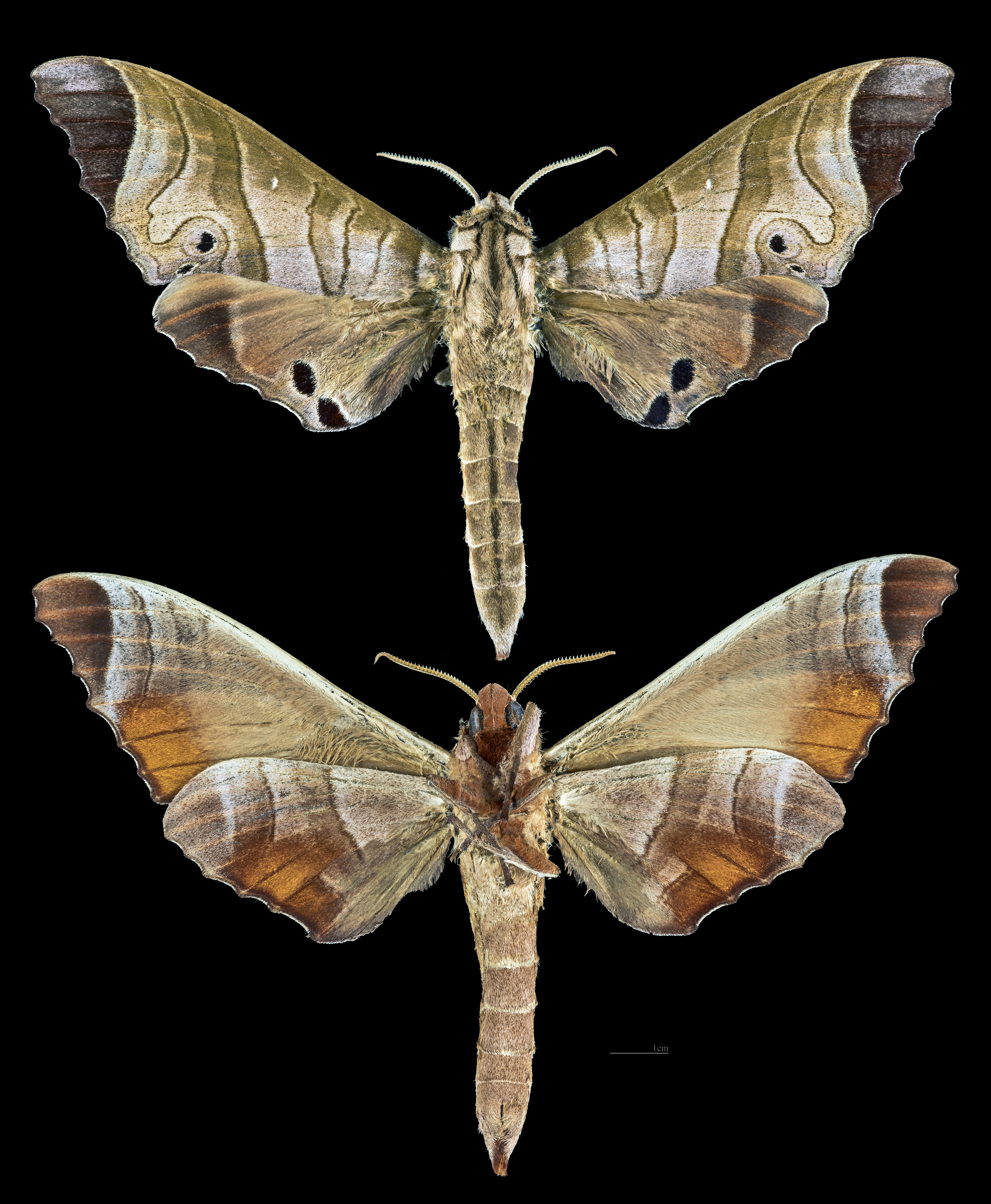
Marumba saishiuana

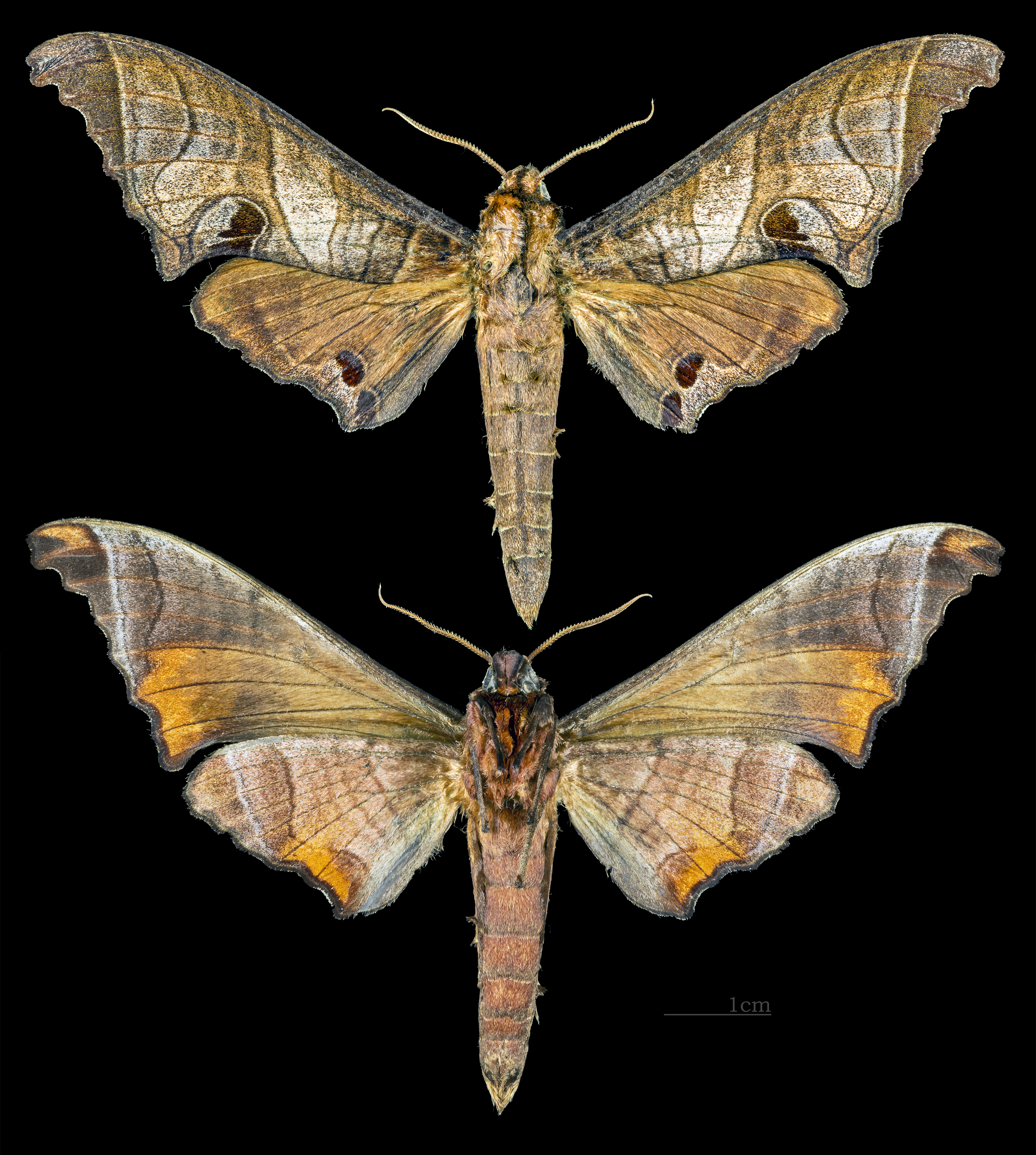
Marumba spectabilis

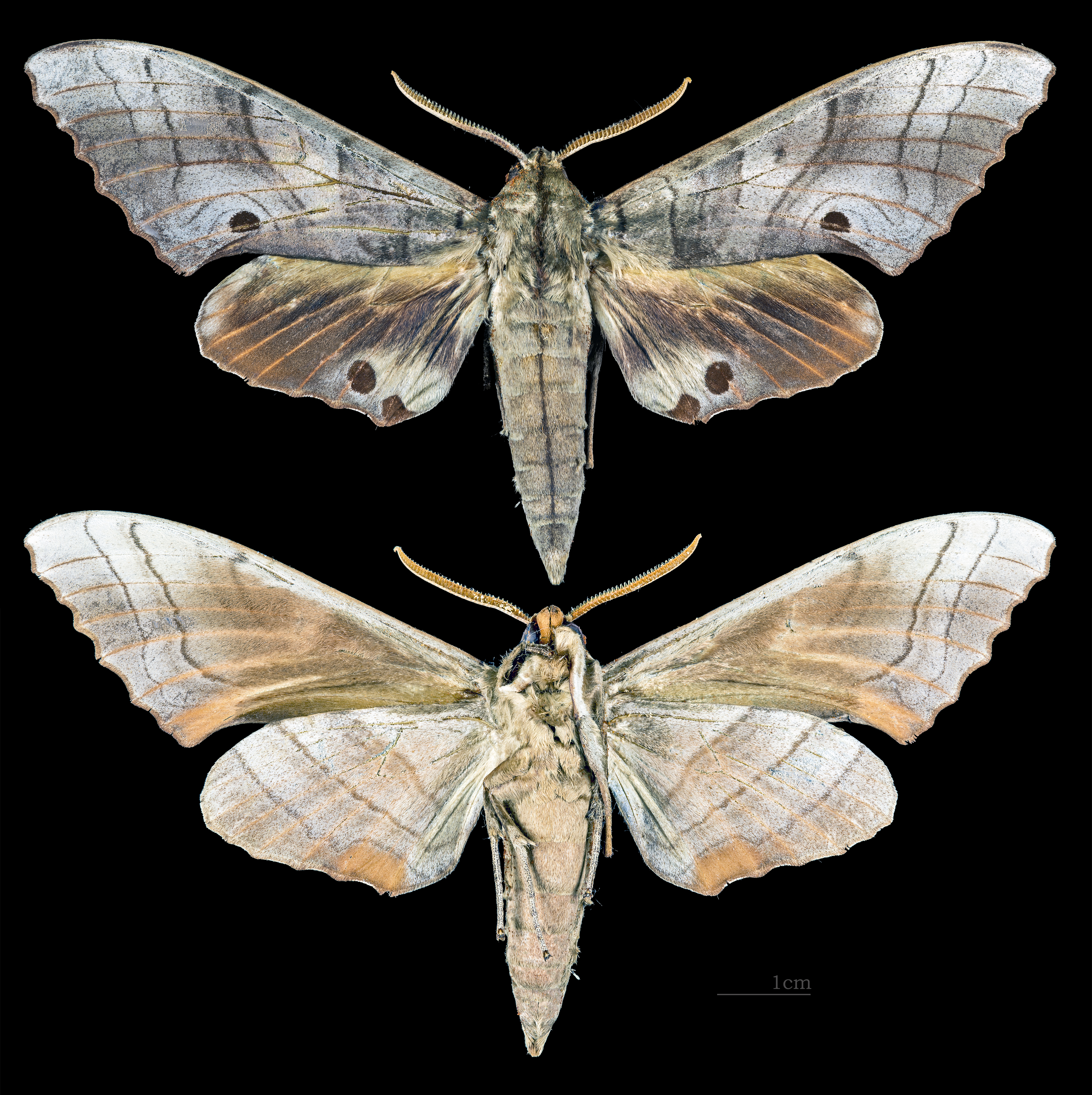
Marumba sperchius

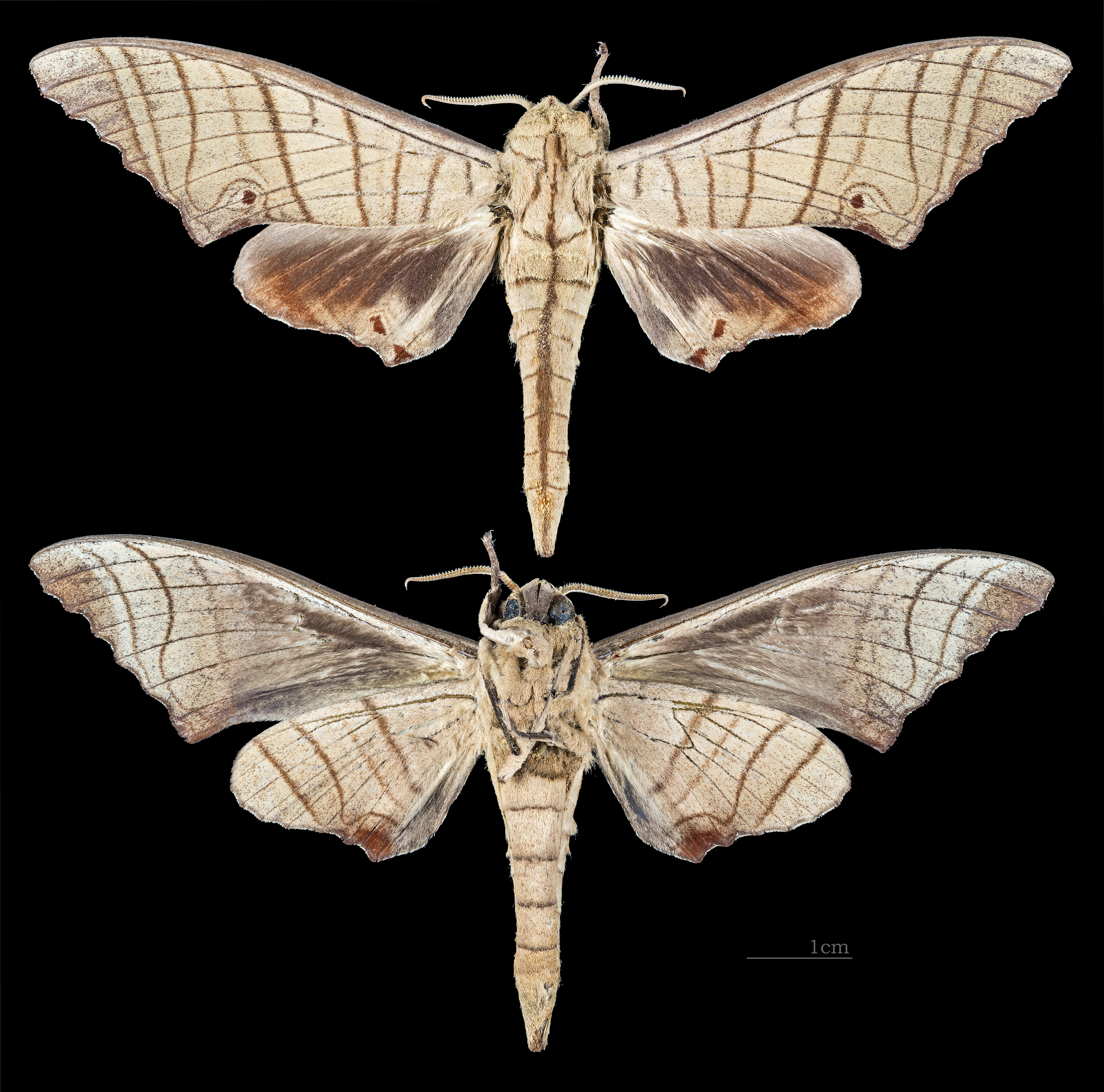
Marumba tigrina
