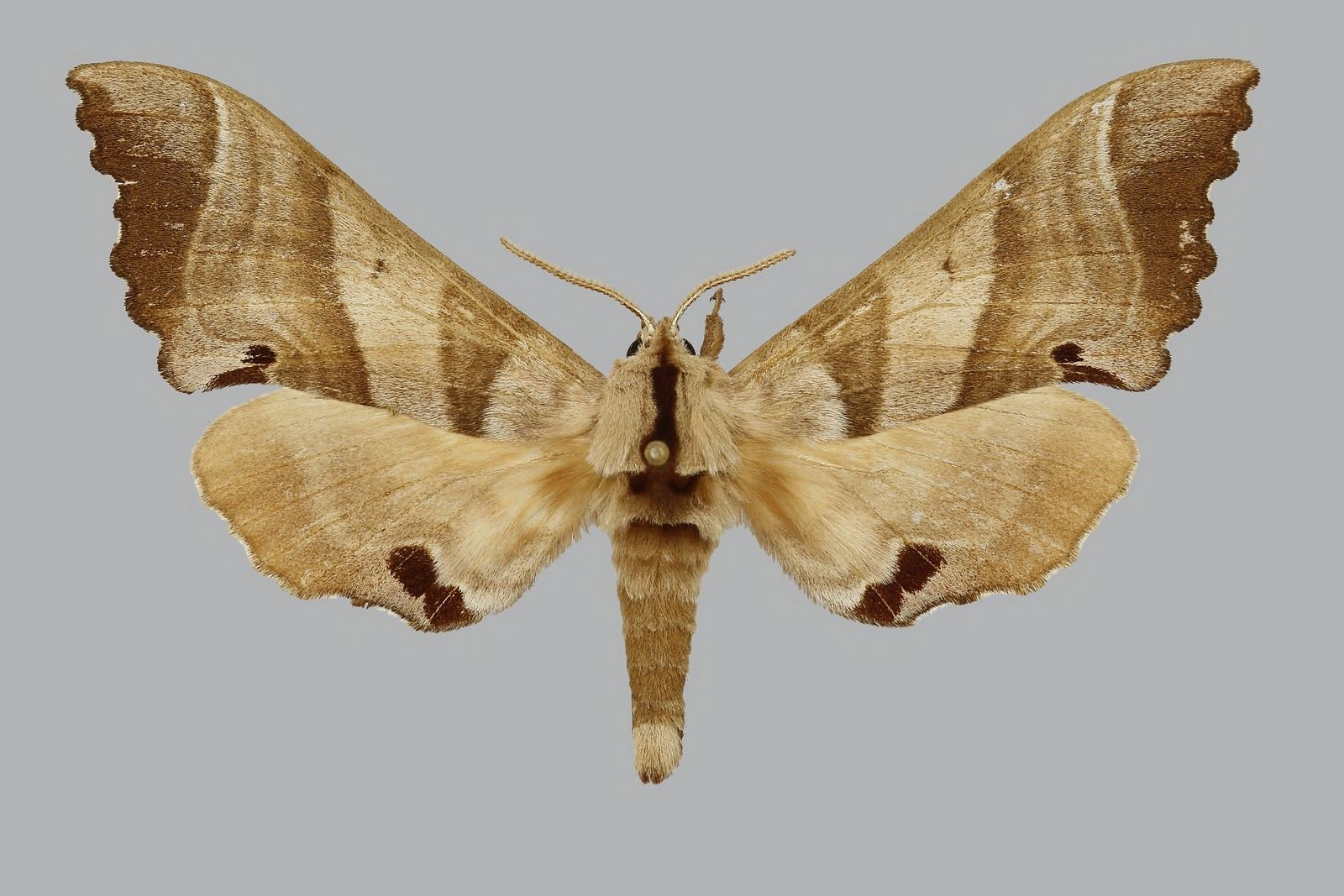
- Marumba fenzelii fenzelii

Scientific classification
- Domain: Eukaryota
- Kingdom: Animalia
- Phylum: Arthropoda
- Class: Insecta
- Order: Lepidoptera
- Family: Sphingidae
- Genus: Marumba
- Species: M. fenzelii

Binomial name
- Marumba fenzelii Mell, 1937

= Marumba fenzelii =

Species of moth

Marumba fenzelii is a species of moth of the family Sphingidae. It is known from China.

== Subspecies ==
- Marumba fenzelii fenzelii (Shaanxi and Sichuan in China)
- Marumba fenzelii connectens Mell, 1939 (Shanxi in China)
