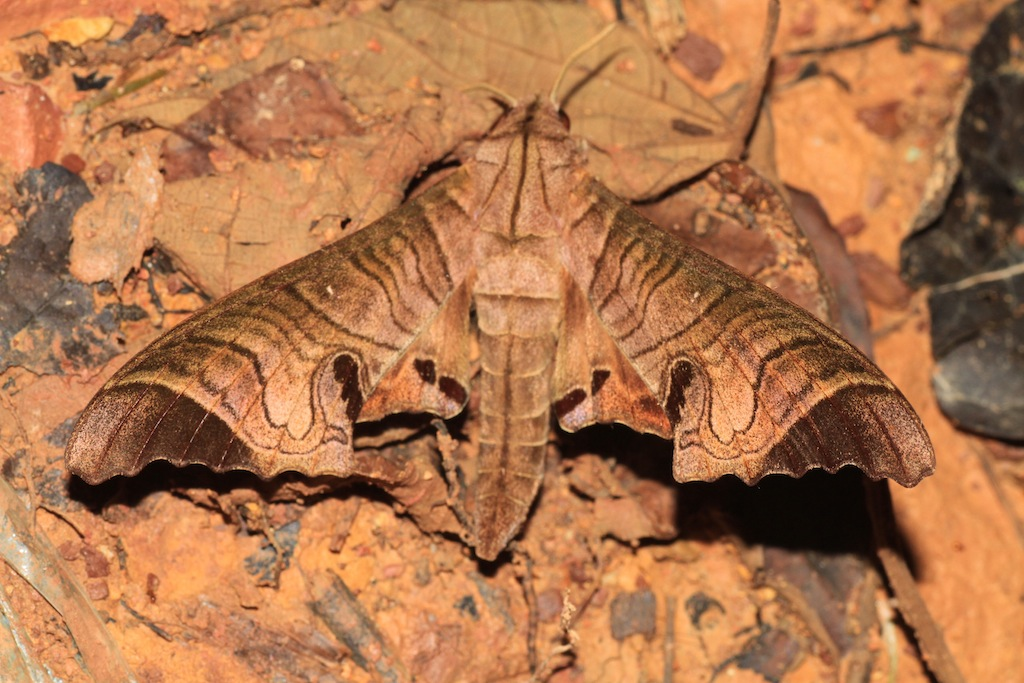
- From Borneo

Scientific classification
- Domain: Eukaryota
- Kingdom: Animalia
- Phylum: Arthropoda
- Class: Insecta
- Order: Lepidoptera
- Family: Sphingidae
- Genus: Marumba
- Species: M. spectabilis

Binomial name
- Marumba spectabilis (Butler, 1875)

Synonyms
- Triptogon spectabilis Butler, 1875; Marumba spectabilis chinensis Mell, 1922; Marumba spectabilis tonkini Clark, 1933

= Marumba spectabilis =

Species of moth

Marumba spectabilis, the rosey swirled hawkmoth, is a moth of the family Sphingidae. The species was first described by Arthur Gardiner Butler in 1875.

== Distribution ==
It is known from Nepal, north-eastern India, southern China, Thailand, Laos, Vietnam, Malaysia (Peninsular, Sarawak) and Indonesia (Sumatra, Java, Kalimantan, Sulawesi).

== Description ==
The wingspan is 94–118 mm. It is more rufous brown than other Marumba species.

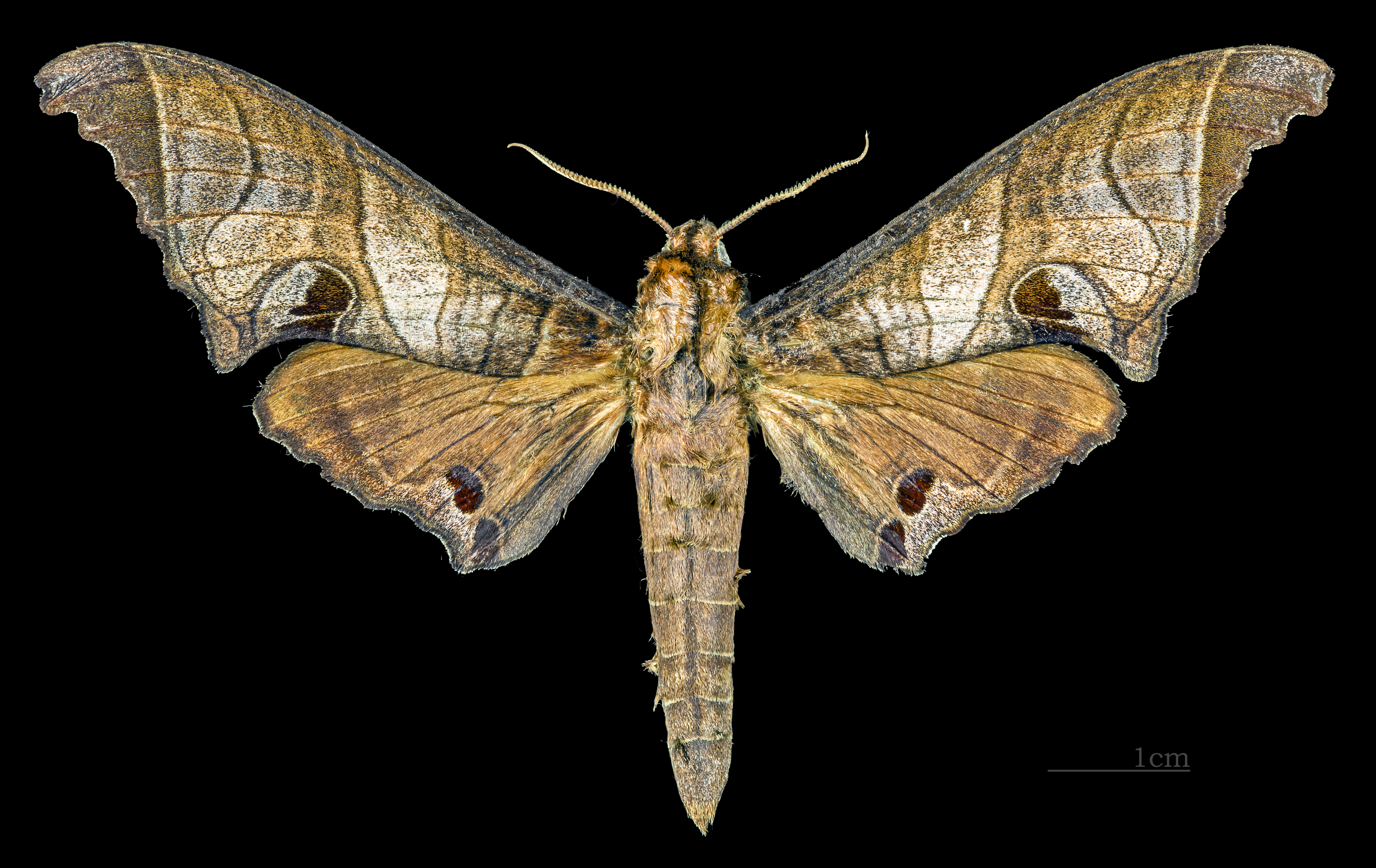
Male dorsal

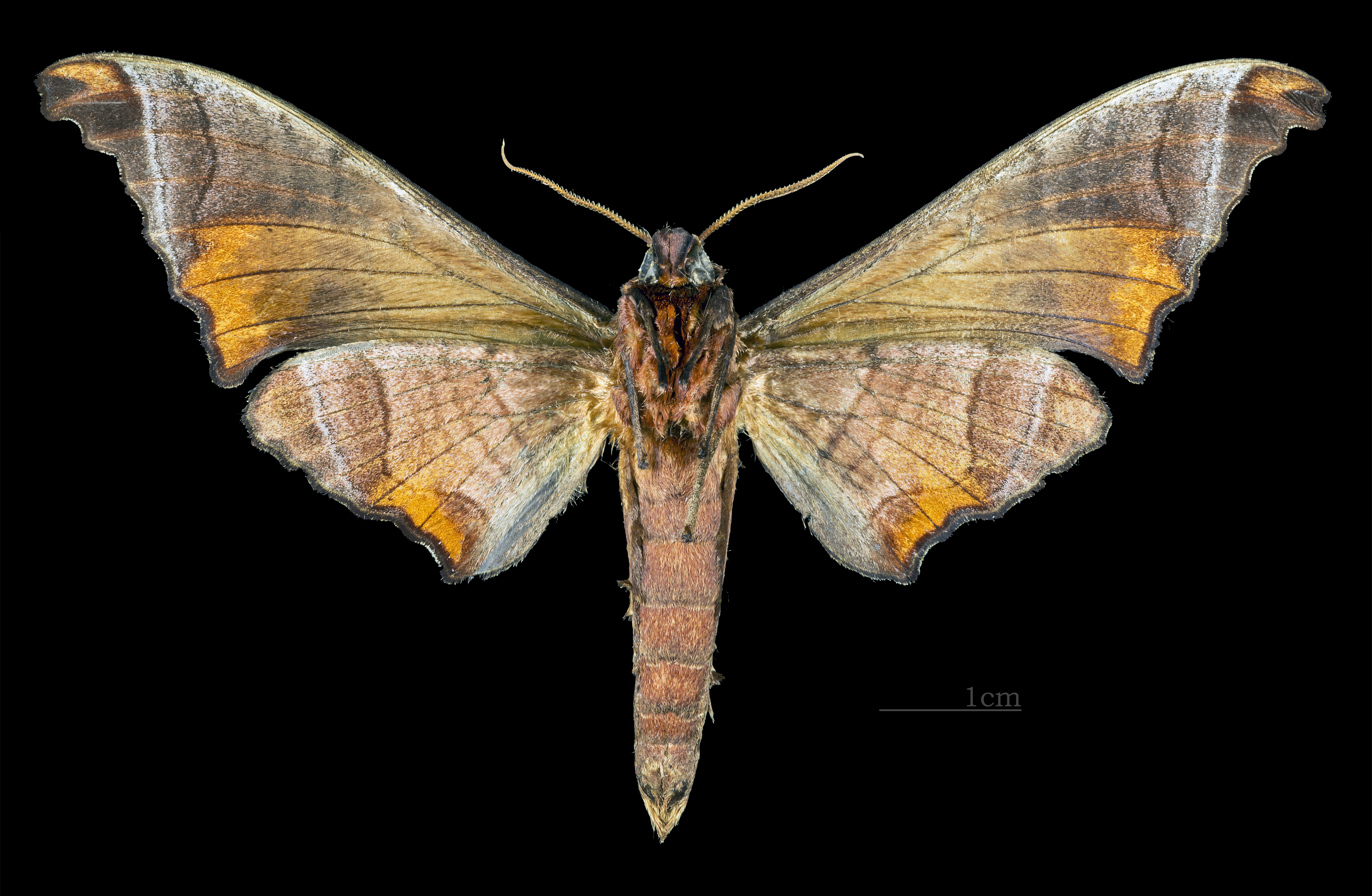
Male ventral

== Biology ==
There are three generations per year in northern Guangdong.

The larvae have been recorded feeding on Meliosma rigida.

== Subspecies ==
- Marumba spectabilis spectabilis
- Marumba spectabilis malayana Rothschild & Jordan, 1903 (Sundaland)
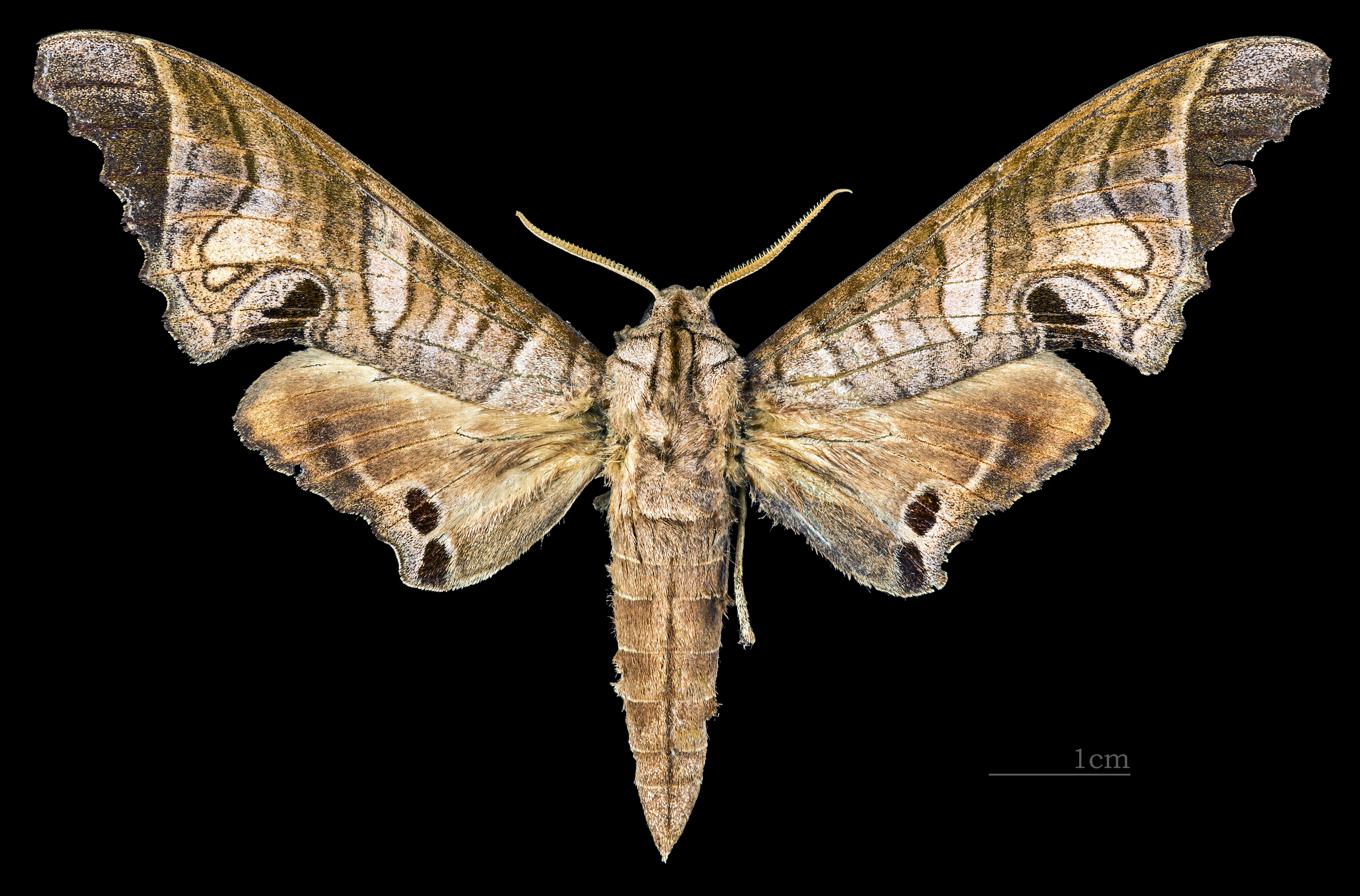
Male M. s. malayana, dorsal view

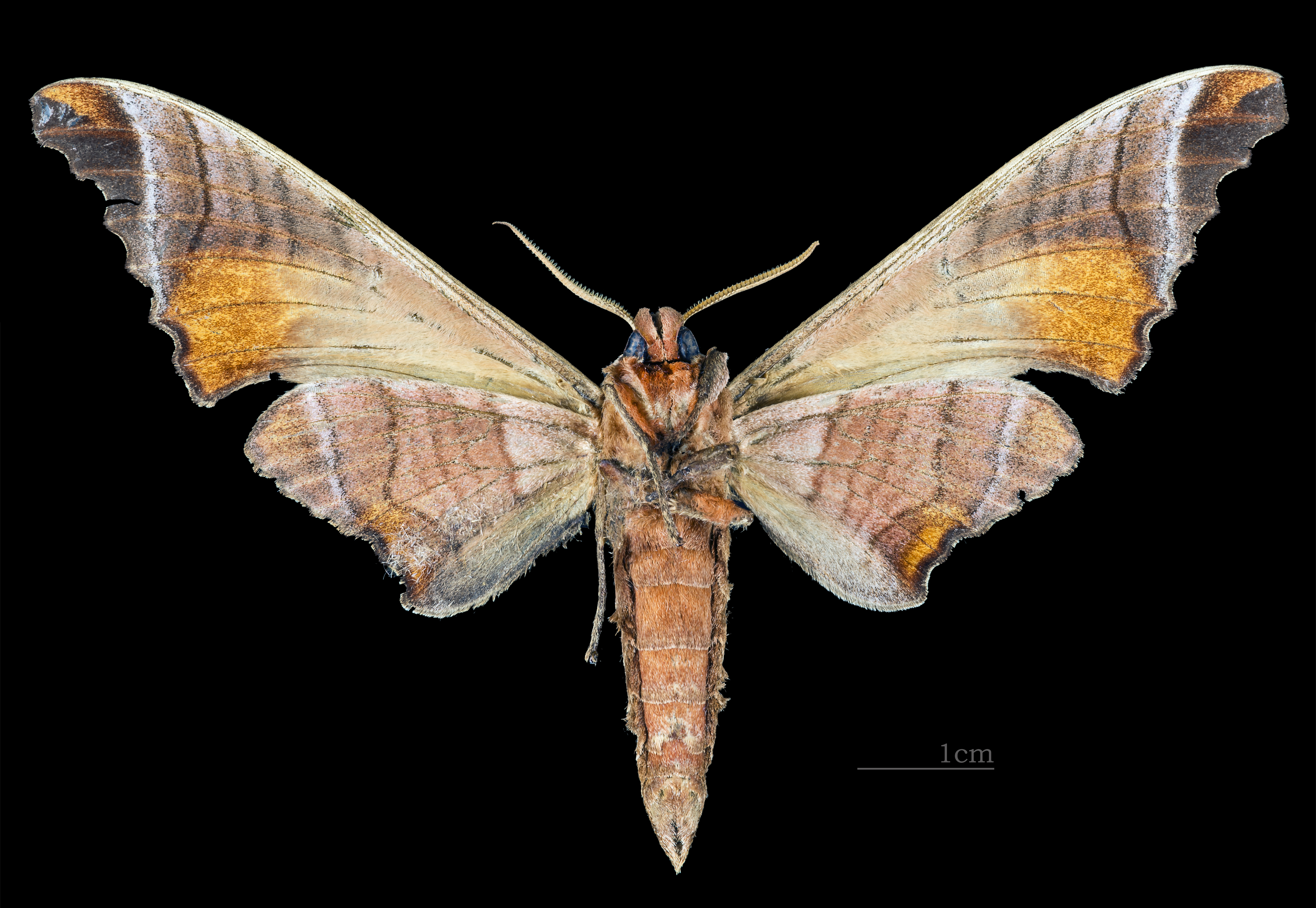
Male M. s. malayana, ventral view
