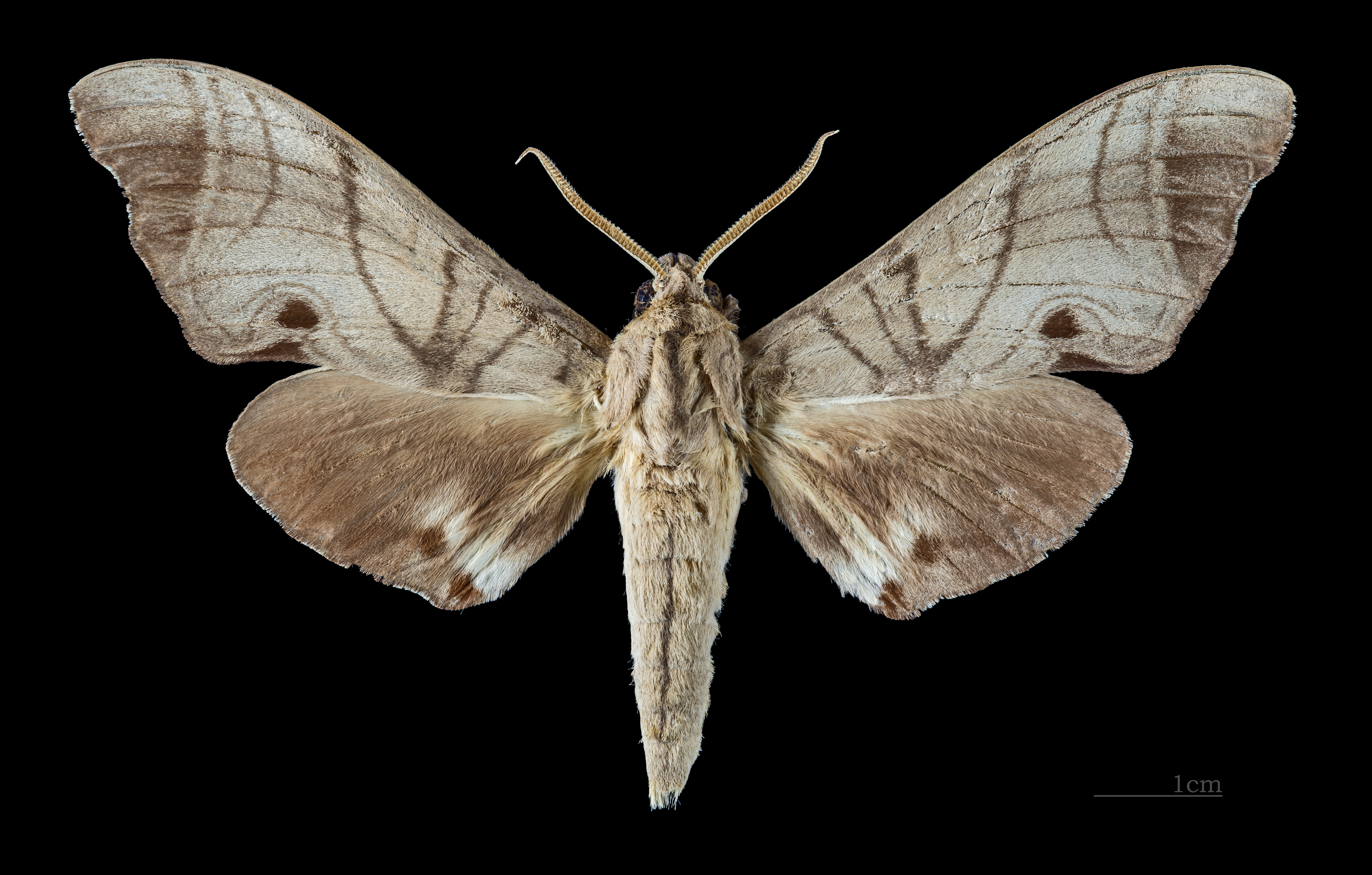
- Marumba amboinicus dorsal MHNT
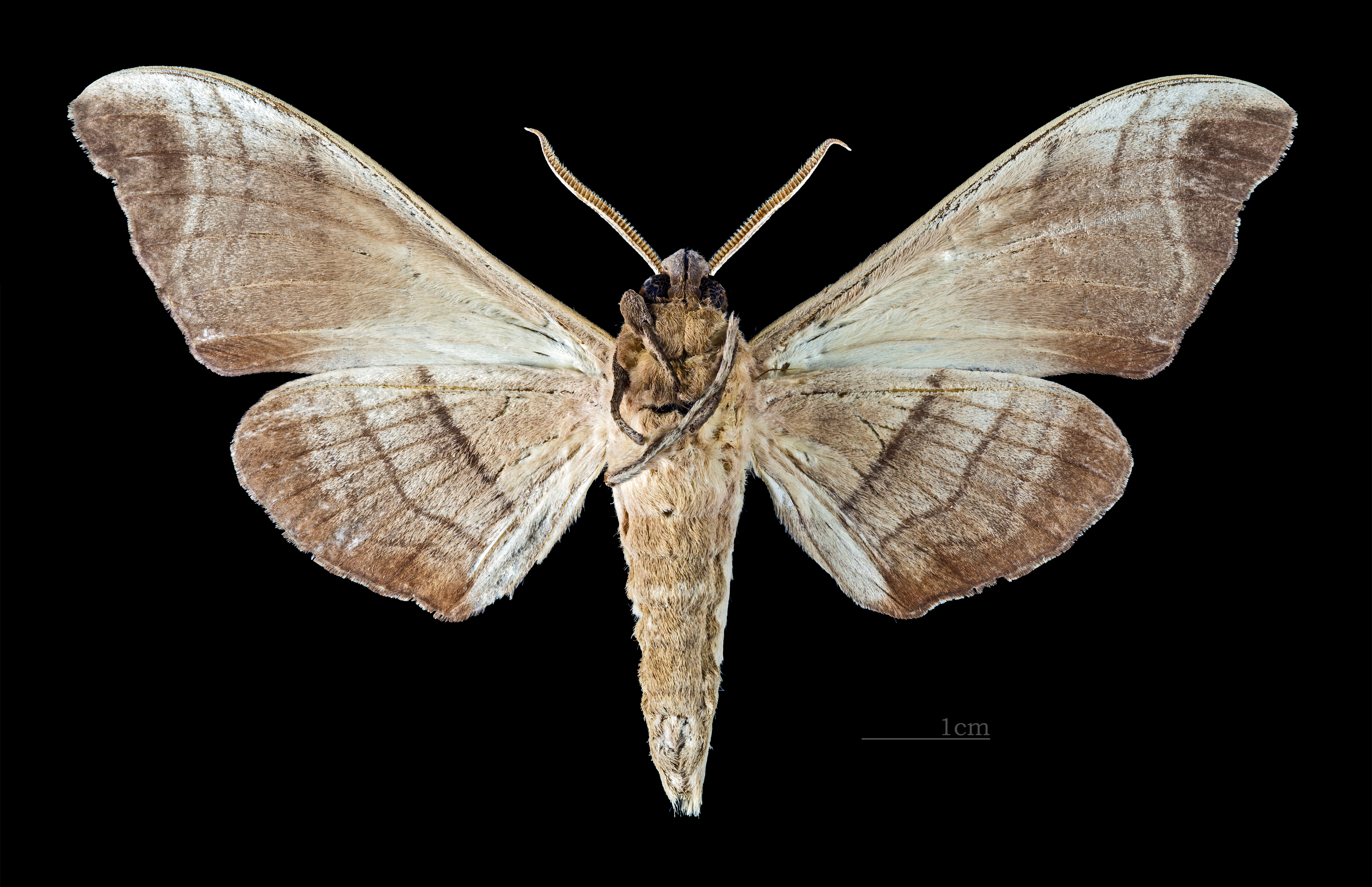
- Marumba amboinicus ventral MHNT

Scientific classification
- Domain: Eukaryota
- Kingdom: Animalia
- Phylum: Arthropoda
- Class: Insecta
- Order: Lepidoptera
- Family: Sphingidae
- Genus: Marumba
- Species: M. amboinicus

Binomial name
- Marumba amboinicus (C Felder, 1861)

Synonyms
- Smerinthus amboinicus C. Felder, 1861

= Marumba amboinicus =

Species of moth

Marumba amboinicus is a species of moth of the family Sphingidae. It is known from Indonesia and the Philippines.

== Subspecies ==
- Marumba amboinicus amboinicus (Indonesia (Ceram, Ambon, Sulawesi, the Philippines)
- Marumba amboinicus celebensis Rothschild & Jordan, 1903 (Sulawesi)
- Marumba amboinicus luzoni Clark, 1935 (the Philippines)
- Marumba amboinicus rothschildi Huwe, 1906 (Bacan)
