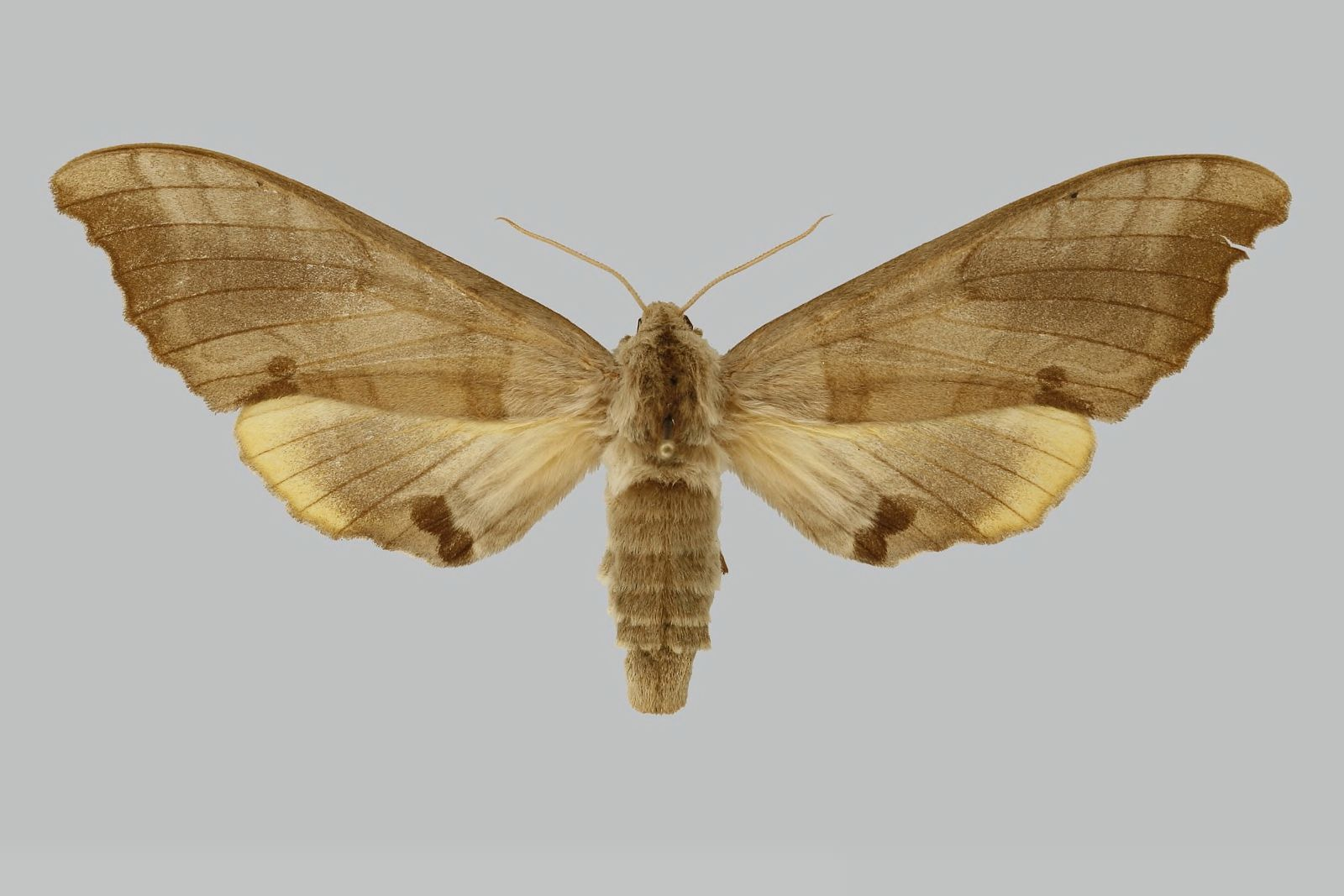
- Marumba maackii maackii, female, upperside. Russia, Ussuri, Gusevsky River

Scientific classification
- Kingdom: Animalia
- Phylum: Arthropoda
- Class: Insecta
- Order: Lepidoptera
- Family: Sphingidae
- Genus: Marumba
- Species: M. maackii

Binomial name
- Marumba maackii (Bremer, 1861)

Synonyms
- Smerinthus maackii Bremer, 1861; Marumba maackii bipunctata O. Bang-Haas, 1936; Marumba maackii jankowskioides O. Bang-Haas, 1936

= Marumba maackii =

Species of moth

Marumba maackii, the Manchurian hawkmoth, is a species of moth of the family Sphingidae. It is known from the Russian Far East, north-eastern China, North Korea, South Korea and Hokkaido in northern Japan.

The wingspan is 78–96 mm.

There is one main generation in the Russian Far East with adults on wing from June to late July.

The larvae feed on Tilia species, including particularly Tilia amurensis, Tilia japonica, Tilia platyphyllos and Tilia tomentosa.

== Subspecies ==
- Marumba maackii maackii (Russian Far East, northeastern China, North Korea, South Korea and northern Japan (Hokkaido))
- Marumba maackii ochreata Mell, 1935 (Tianmu Mountains of Zhejiang in China)
