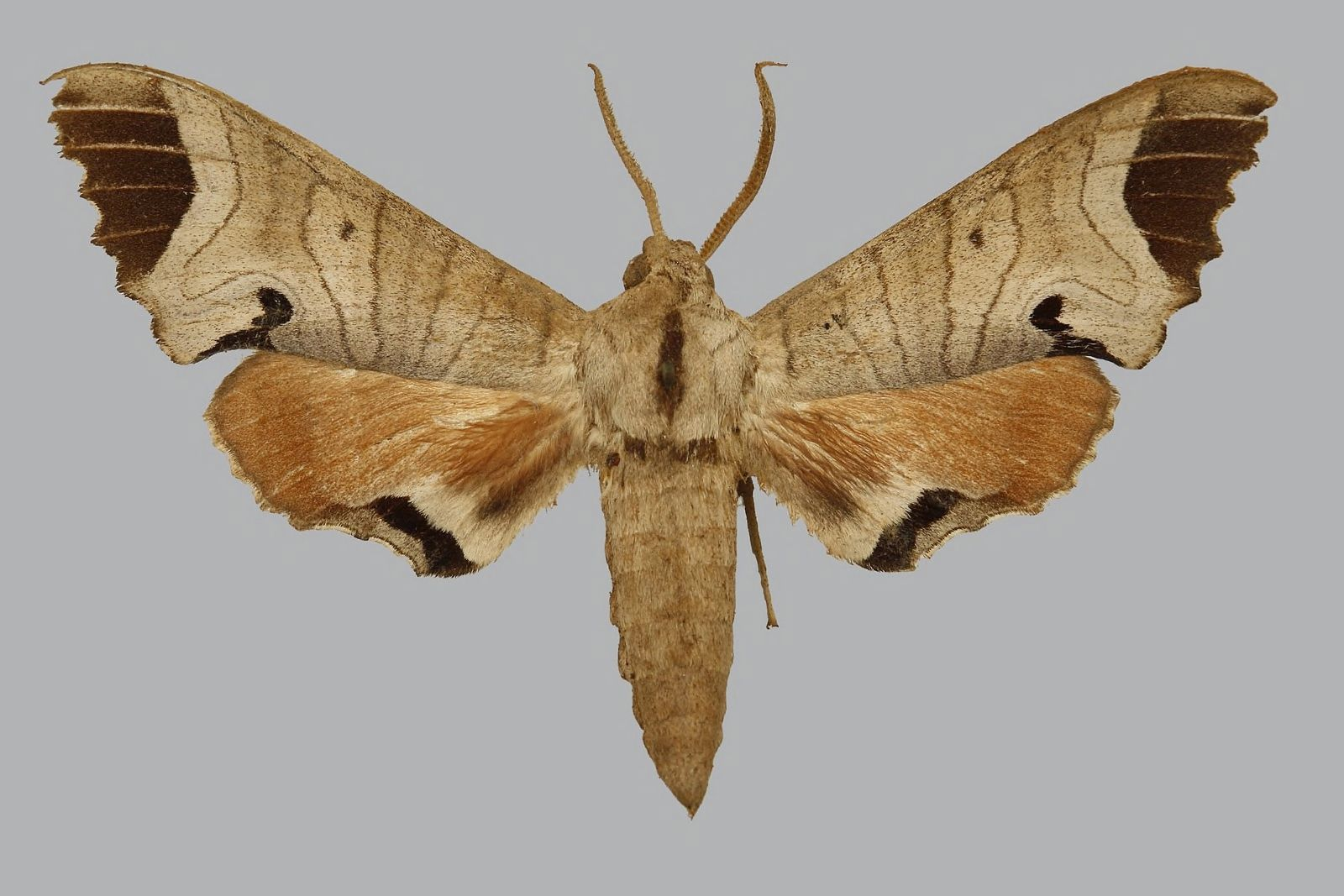
- Marumba indicus male upperside

Scientific classification
- Domain: Eukaryota
- Kingdom: Animalia
- Phylum: Arthropoda
- Class: Insecta
- Order: Lepidoptera
- Family: Sphingidae
- Genus: Marumba
- Species: M. indicus

Binomial name
- Marumba indicus (Walker, 1856)

Synonyms
- Smerinthus indicus Walker, 1856; Marumba bengalensis Hampson, 1912; Triptogon rectilinea Moore, 1879

= Marumba indicus =

Species of moth

Marumba indicus is a species of moth of the family Sphingidae. It is known from India.
