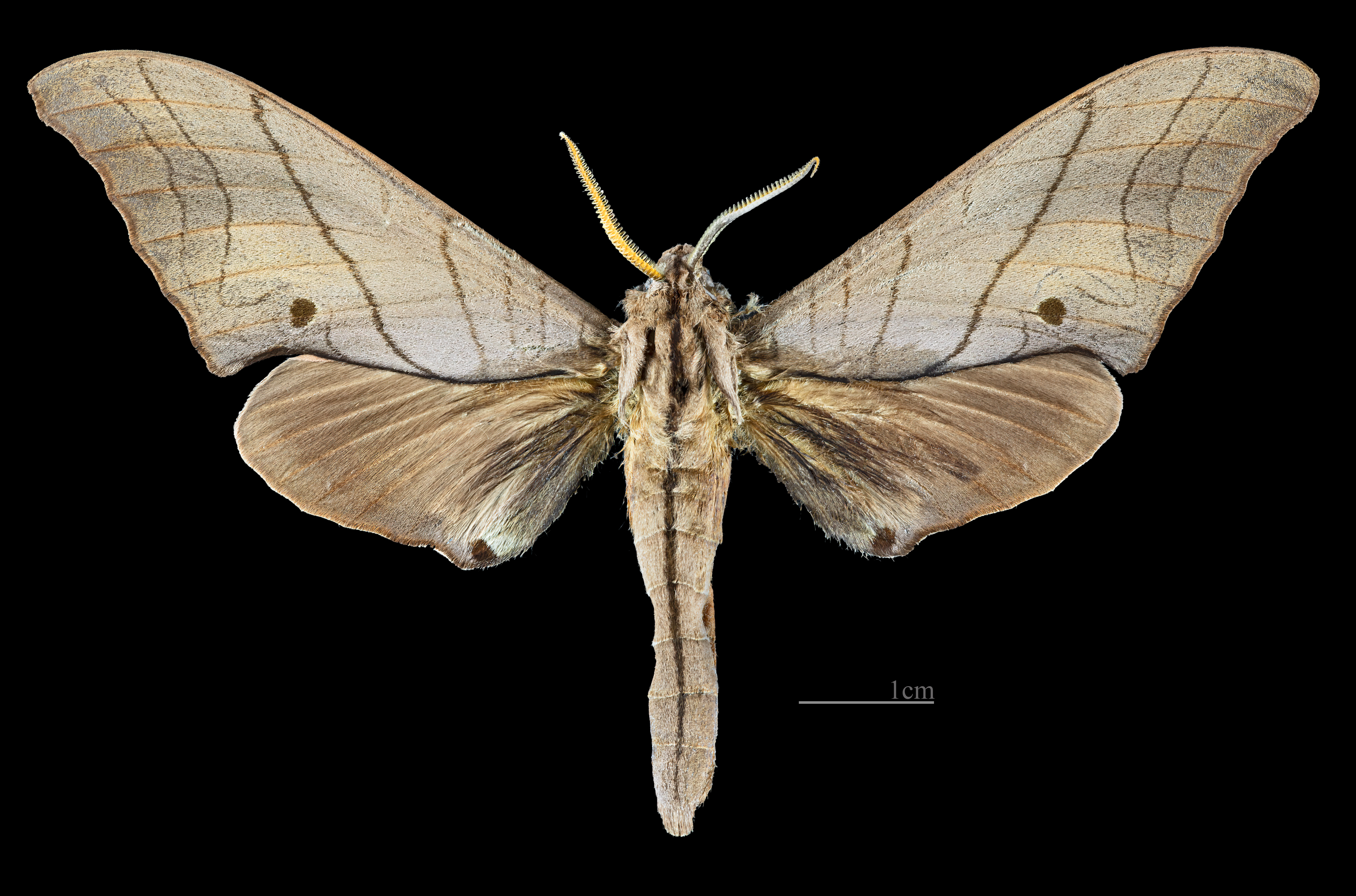
- Marumba diehli ♂
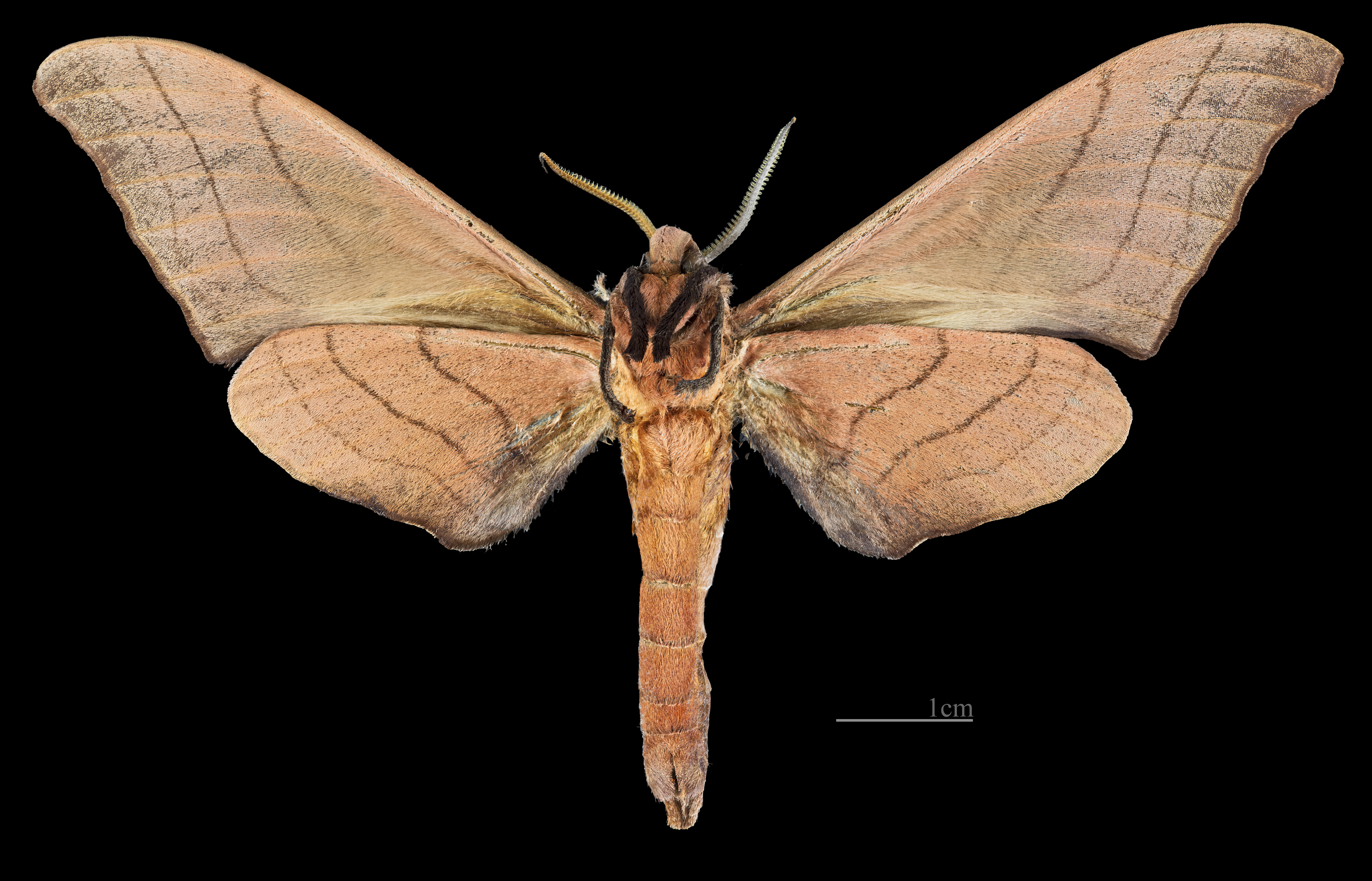
- Marumba diehli ♂ △

Scientific classification
- Domain: Eukaryota
- Kingdom: Animalia
- Phylum: Arthropoda
- Class: Insecta
- Order: Lepidoptera
- Family: Sphingidae
- Genus: Marumba
- Species: M. diehli

Binomial name
- Marumba diehli Roesler & Kuppers, 1975

= Marumba diehli =

Species of moth

Marumba diehli is a species of moth of the family Sphingidae. It is known from Sumatra and Java.
