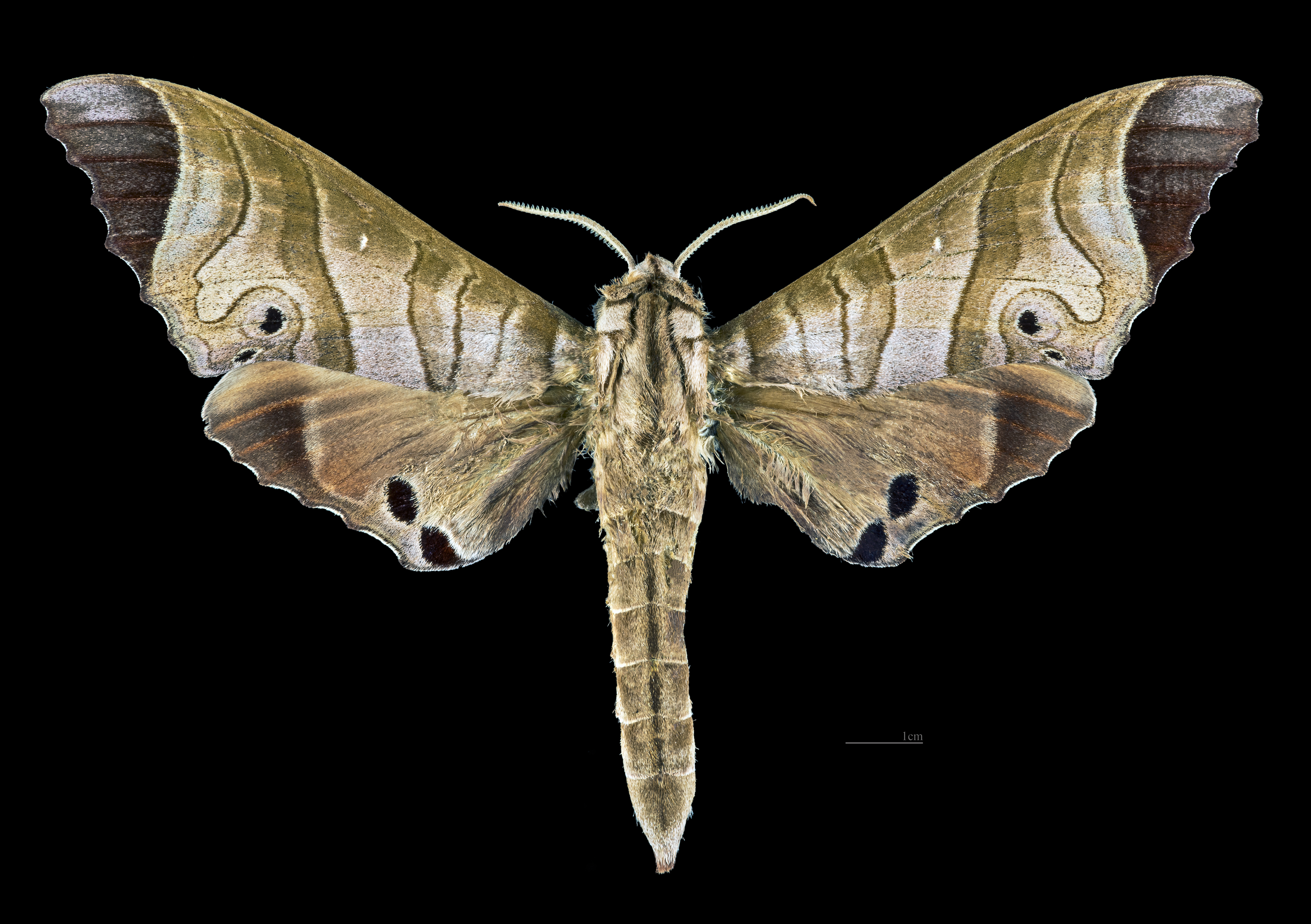
- Male dorsal
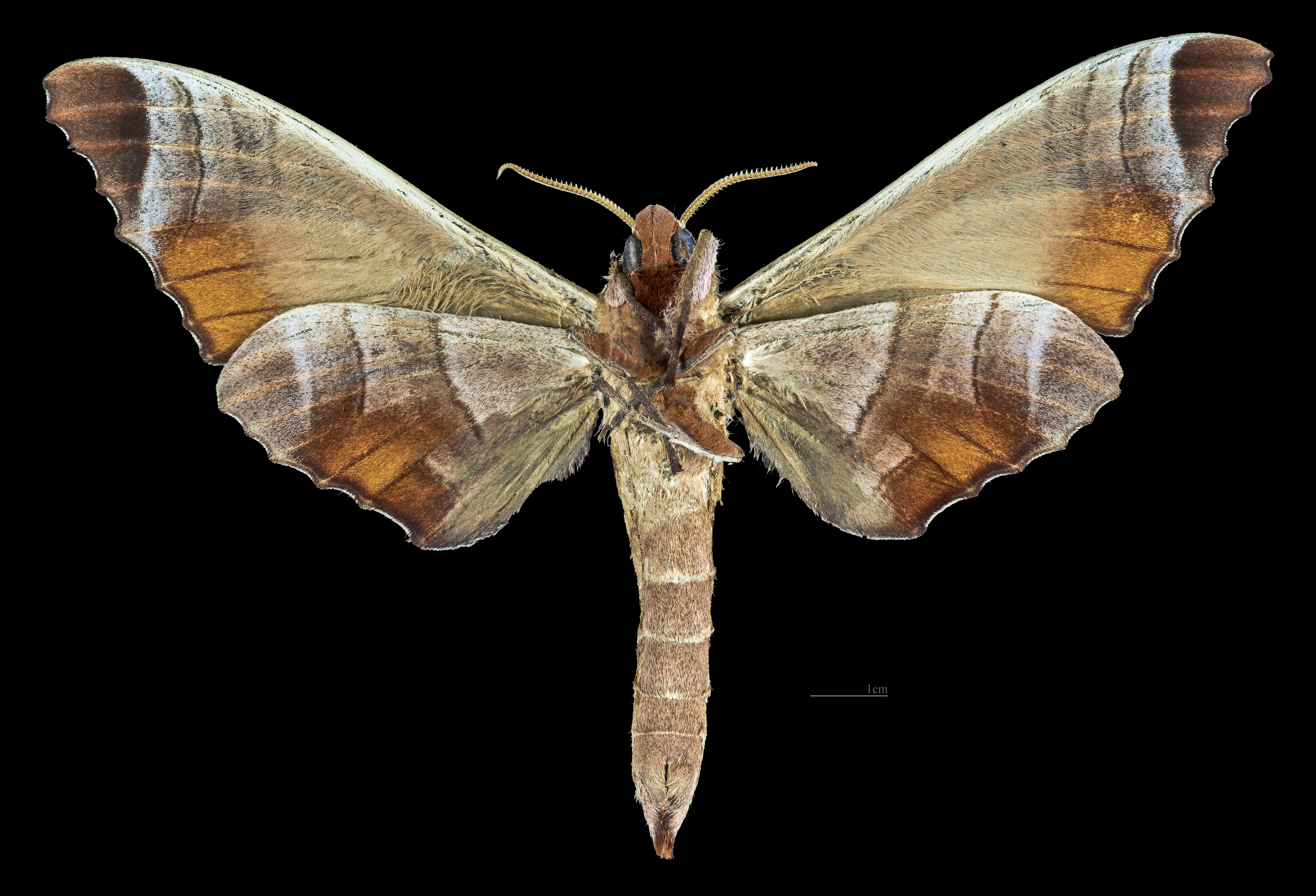
- Male ventral

Scientific classification
- Domain: Eukaryota
- Kingdom: Animalia
- Phylum: Arthropoda
- Class: Insecta
- Order: Lepidoptera
- Family: Sphingidae
- Genus: Marumba
- Species: M. saishiuana

Binomial name
- Marumba saishiuana Okamoto, 1924

Synonyms
- Marumba fujinensis Zhu & Wang, 1997; Marumba spectabilior Mell, 1935

= Marumba saishiuana =

Species of moth

Marumba saishiuana is a species of moth of the family Sphingidae.

== Distribution ==
It is known from south-eastern China, southern South Korea, Japan (Tsushima Island), northern Thailand, northern Vietnam and Taiwan.

== Description ==
The wingspan is 75–85 mm. Adults are on wing from May to July in Korea.

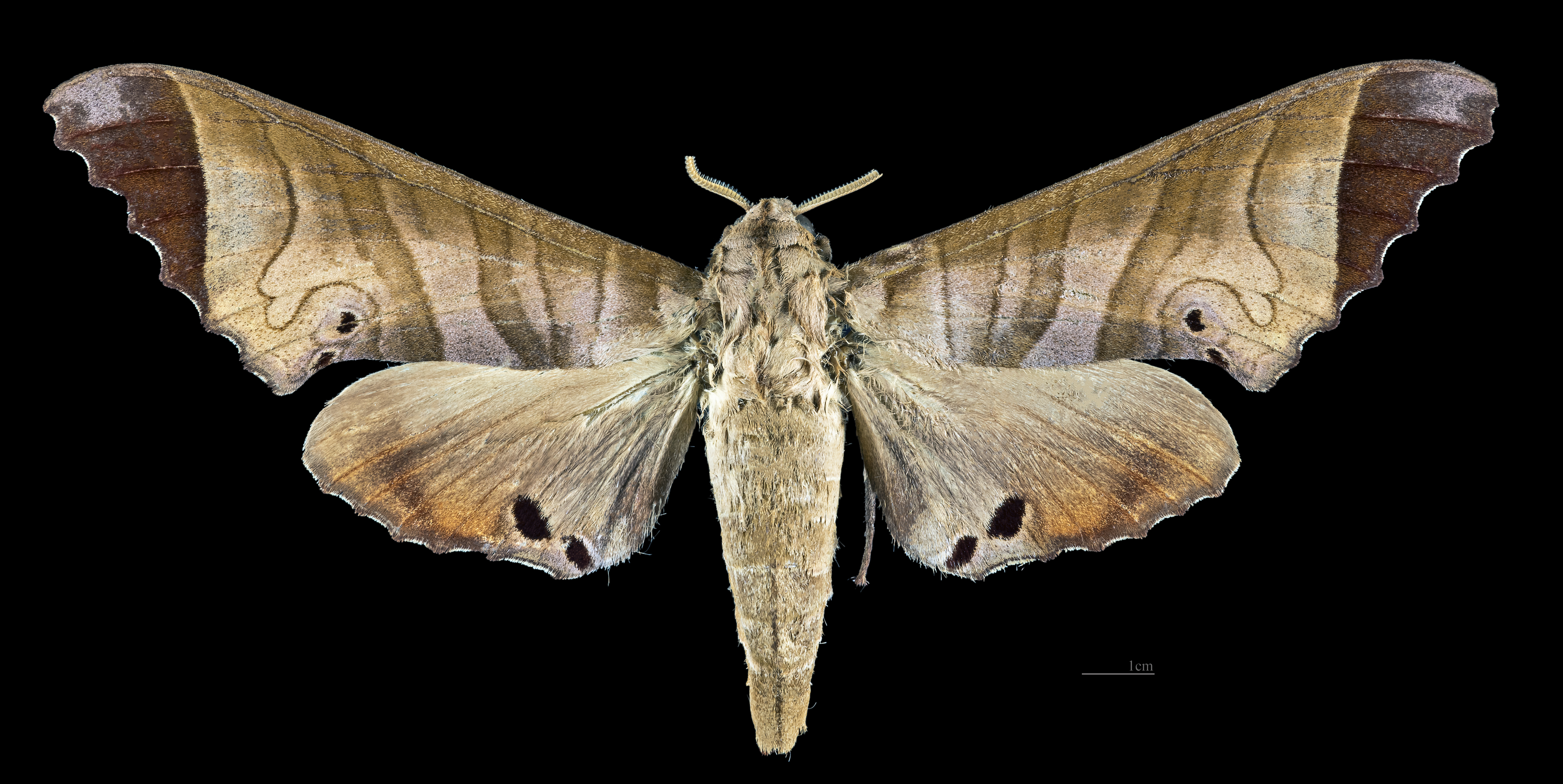
Female dorsal

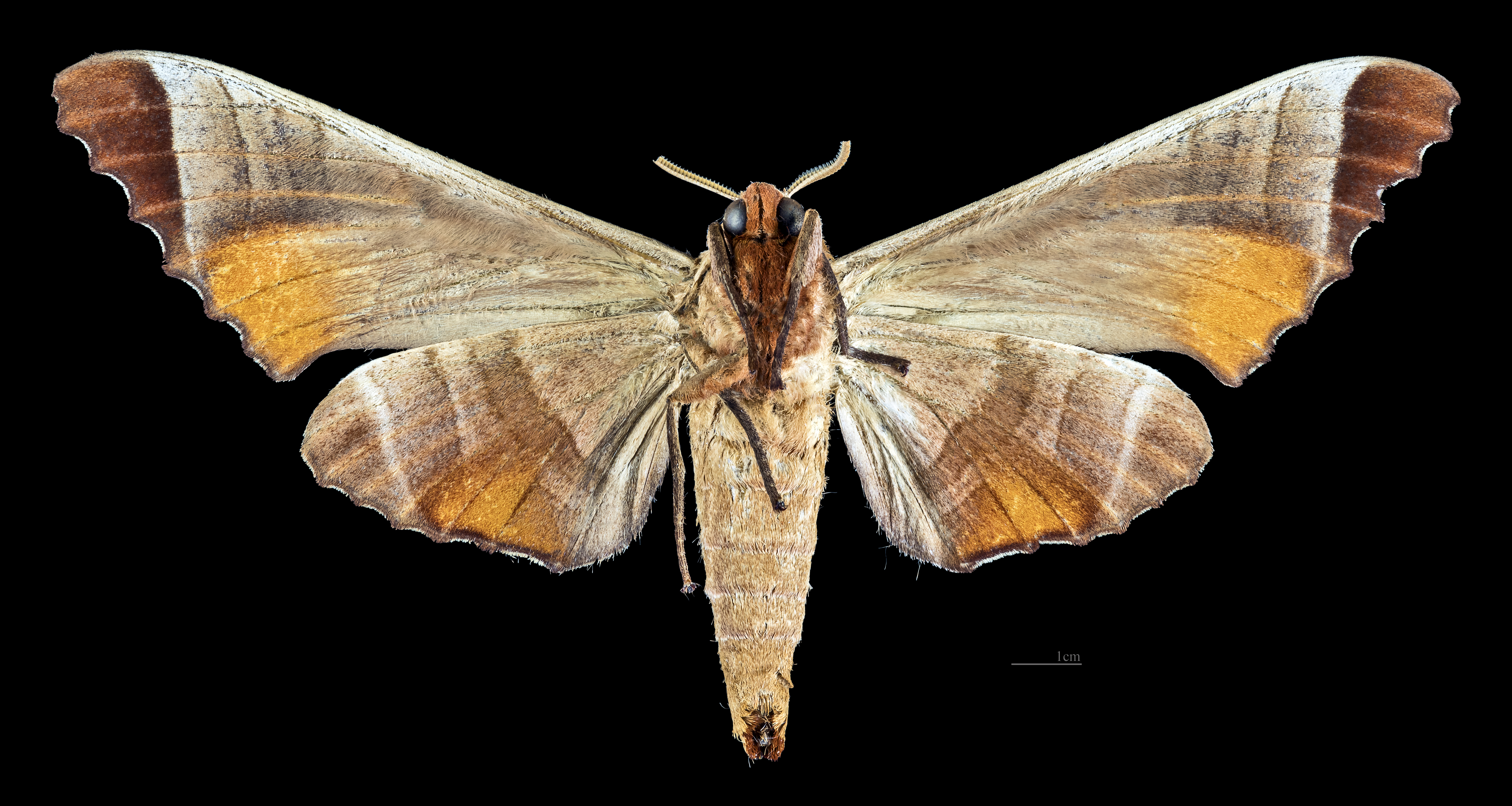
Female ventral

== Subspecies ==
- Marumba saishiuana saishiuana (south-eastern China, southern South Korea, Japan (Tsushima Island), northern Thailand and northern Vietnam)
- Marumba saishiuana formosana Matsumura, 1927 (Taiwan)
