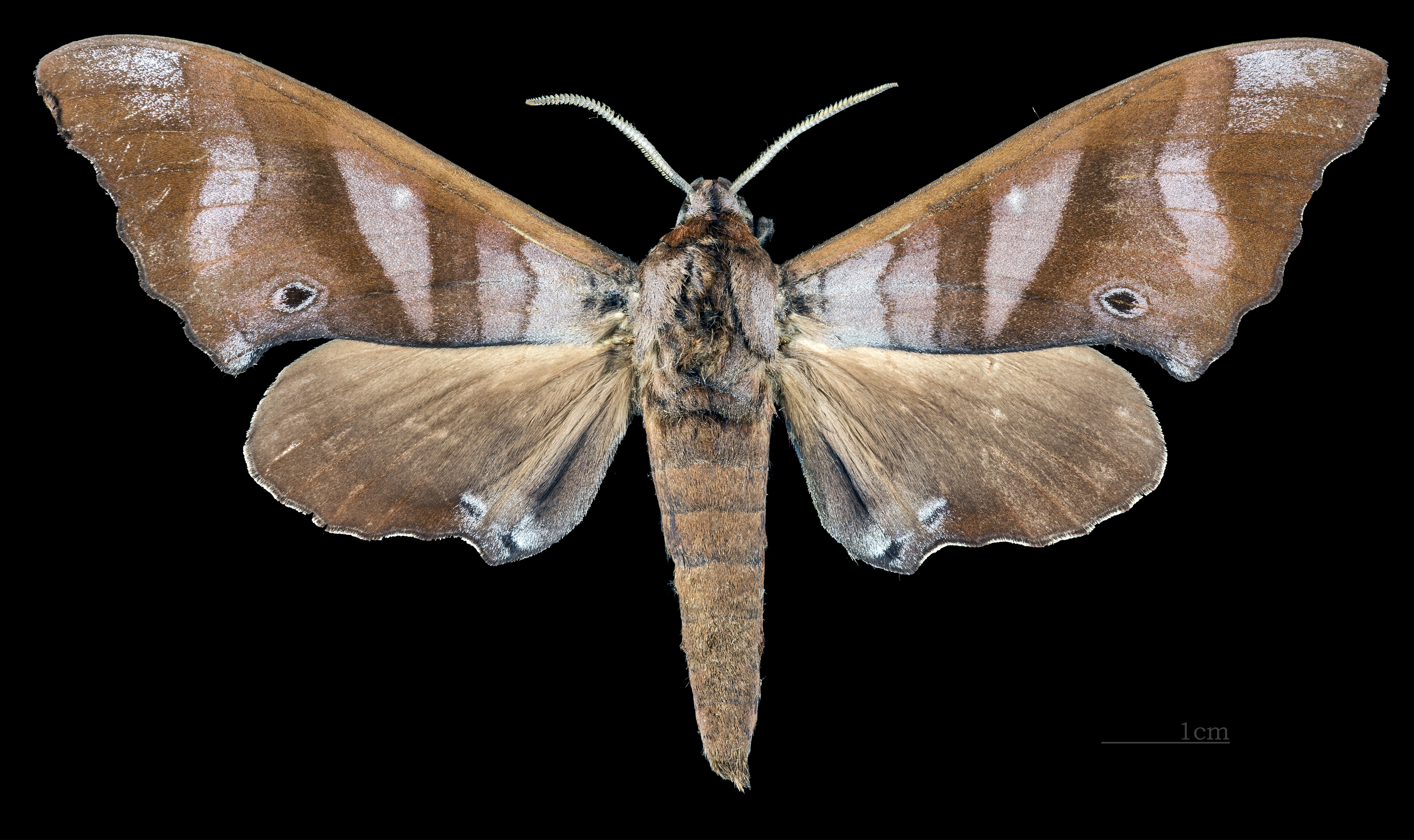
- Marumba nympha dorsal
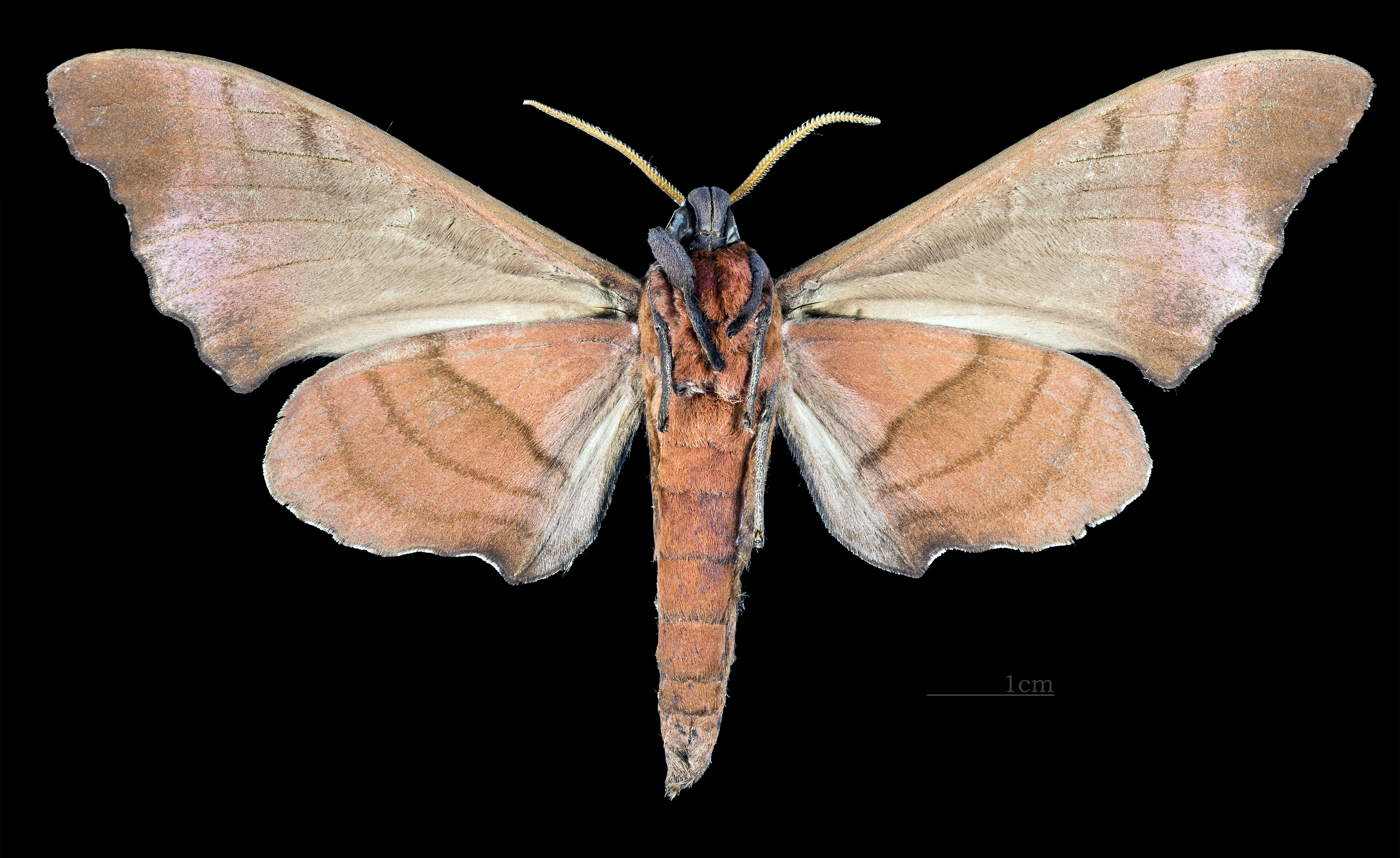
- Marumba nympha ventral

Scientific classification
- Domain: Eukaryota
- Kingdom: Animalia
- Phylum: Arthropoda
- Class: Insecta
- Order: Lepidoptera
- Family: Sphingidae
- Genus: Marumba
- Species: M. nympha

Binomial name
- Marumba nympha Rothschild & Jordan, 1903

= Marumba nympha =

Species of moth

Marumba nympha is a species of moth of the family Sphingidae. It is known from India.
