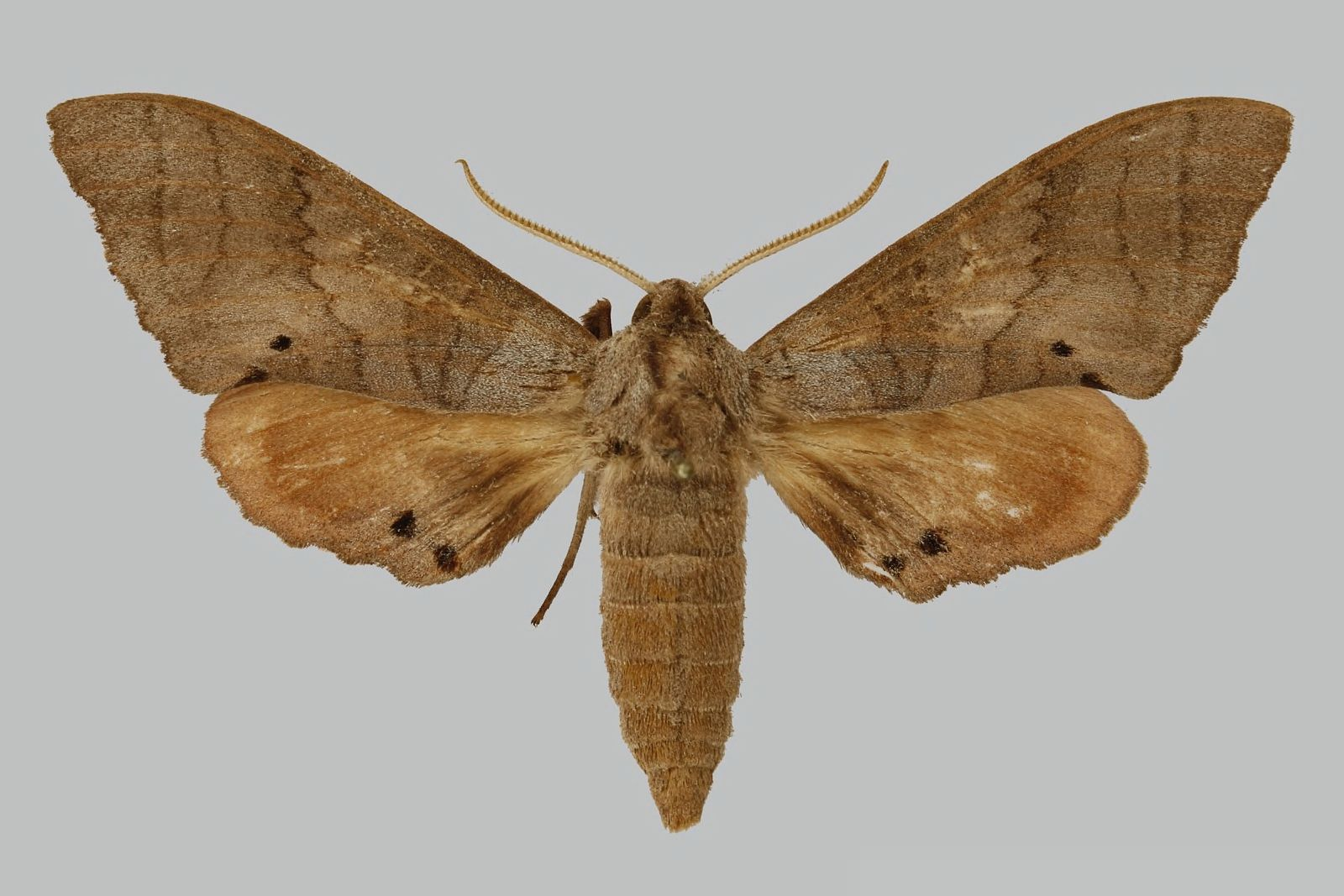

Scientific classification
- Domain: Eukaryota
- Kingdom: Animalia
- Phylum: Arthropoda
- Class: Insecta
- Order: Lepidoptera
- Family: Sphingidae
- Genus: Marumba
- Species: M. timora

Binomial name
- Marumba timora Rothschild & Jordan, 1903

= Marumba timora =

Species of moth

Marumba timora is a species of moth of the family Sphingidae. It is known from Indonesia.

It is similar to Marumba dyras and Marumba sperchius, but the body and wings are a deeper tint and there is no distinct medial line running over the length of the body. The lines on distal half of the forewing upperside are indistinct and the two spots near the tornus are minute. The hindwing upperside spots are also small.

== Subspecies ==
- Marumba timora timora (Timor)
- Marumba timora laotensis Rothschild & Jordan, 1903 (Larat)
