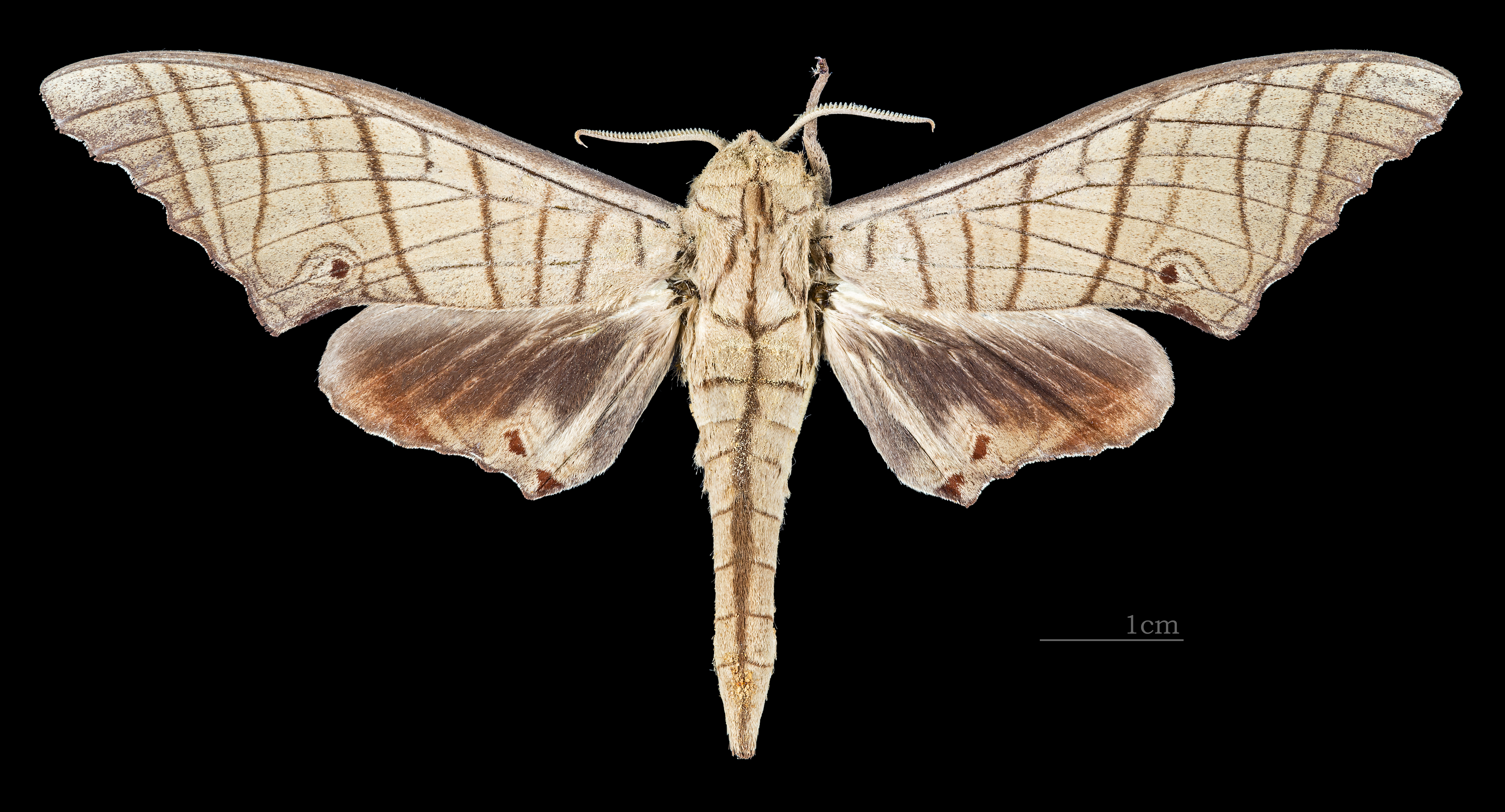
- Male, dorsal view
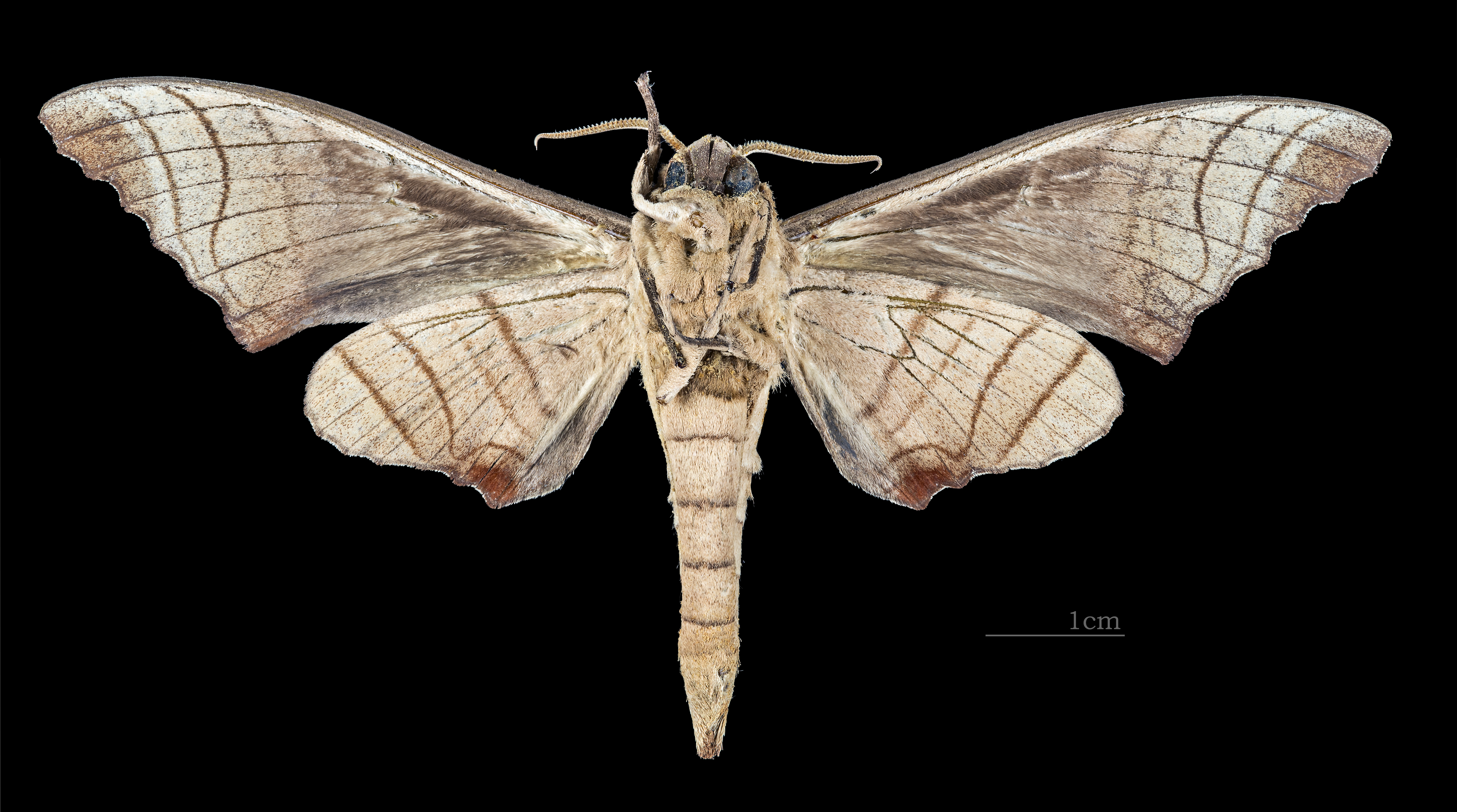
- Male, ventral view

Scientific classification
- Domain: Eukaryota
- Kingdom: Animalia
- Phylum: Arthropoda
- Class: Insecta
- Order: Lepidoptera
- Family: Sphingidae
- Genus: Marumba
- Species: M. tigrina

Binomial name
- Marumba tigrina Gehlen, 1936

= Marumba tigrina =

Species of moth

Marumba tigrina is a species of moth of the family Sphingidae first described by Bruno Gehlen in 1936. It is found in Sumatra, Java and Borneo.
