= Fridolf =

Fridolf is a masculine given name. It is originally a compound of the German words frid (peace) and olf (wolf). The Runic Danish accusative word fraþulf may have a connection, although no parallel is attested in the history of Swedish. Notable people with the name include:

- Fridolf Heck, Finnish naval captain, whaler, free trader, and settler in the Russian Ussuri krai
- Fridolf Lundsten (1884–1947), a Finnish wrestler
- Fridolf Jansson (1904–1991), a Swedish politician
- Fridolf Martinsson, a Swedish footballer
- Fridolf Rhudin, Swedish actor and comedian
- Johan Fridolf Hagfors (1857–1931), a Swedish newspaper publisher and composer
