= Arnold Moltrecht =

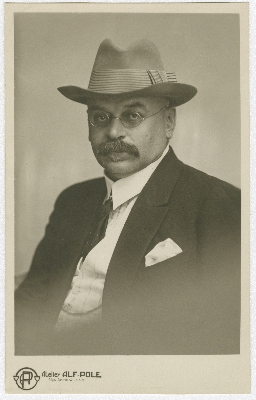

Arnold Karlovich Moltrecht or in the German form Arnold Christian Alexander Moltrecht (15 August 1873 – 13 February 1952) was a Russian, Soviet and Balitc German ophthalmologist and lepidopterist who worked in Vladivostok and collected specimens extensively in eastern Asia. A number of species described from his collections, including the frog Zhangixalus moltrechti, the fish Aphyocypris moltrechti and the moth Catocala moltrechti, are named after him.

== Life and work ==
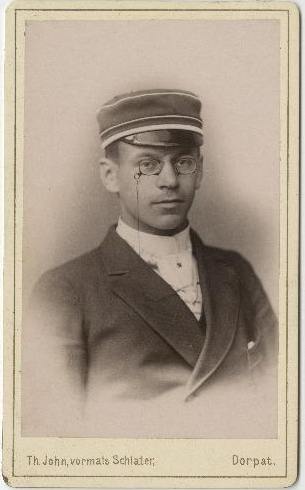
Moltrecht in youth, carte-de-viste

Moltrecht was born in Livonia, the son of a Lutheran pastor named Karl. He studied at the Birkenruh Gymnasium (now in Latvia), graduating in 1892 and then studying medicine at the University of Dorpat. It is thought that his family may have had connections to the Counts Osten-Sacken (of whom Carl Robert Osten-Sacken became a noted lepidopterist) which may have stimulated an early interest in insects, but he began to collect butterflies even in his childhood and the early collections were lost in World War I. He worked at the St. Petersburg eye clinic and then travelled around Europe before returning in August 1902. He was then sent on a mobile ophthalmology unit to eastern Russia. Here he worked as a surgeon and also began to collect and study the local fauna. He became deeply involved in the activities of the Society for the Study of the Amur Territory (OIAK), founded by M.G. Shevelev and others in Vladivostok in 1884 (In 1896 it became a branch of the Imperial Russian Geographical Society and in 1925 it was called the Primorsky branch of the Geographical Society of the USSR.). Moltrecht collected for the local museum and served on the committees of the OIAK. He also associated with V. K. Arsenyev and was a regular visitor to the Yankovsky estate on Sidemi. He also interacted with other lepidopterists like Vladimir Nabokov. Through assistance from P.P. Semenov-Tianshansky, he was able to make a collection trip into parts of China and Taiwan. A large number of bird skins and lepidoptera specimens were collected. The species of butterfly Tajuria moltrechti was among many named after him. In 1909 he wrote on the lepidoptera of Primorye in German. In 1915 he noted the decline of the fauna of the Ussuri region and spoke on the need for preservation. He was arrested on April 28, 1936 by the NKVD as a German spy but was acquitted by a court on June 16, 1936. He was arrested again on August 10, 1938 and according to some sources thought to have been executed. However others suggest that he likely moved in 1944 to Königsberg and published a paper in the Naturmuseum Senckenberg journal under the name Alexander A. Moltrecht who died in Bayreuth, Bavaria. His specimens have been found in Berlin, France and the Czech Republic, in addition to those held in Vladivostok.
