= Jankauskas =

- Lithuanian surname
- m.: Jankauskas
- f.: (unmarried): Jankauskaitė
- f.: (married): Jankauskienė

Jankauskas is a Lithuanian surname. Polish counterpart: Jankowski, Russian: Yankovsky. Notable people with the surname include:

- Algis Jankauskas (born 1982), Lithuanian footballer
- Edgaras Jankauskas (born 1975), Lithuanian footballer and manager
- Eligijus Jankauskas (born 1998), Lithuanian footballer
- Inga Jankauskaitė, Lithuanian actress, singer, and piano player
- Vladas Jankauskas (cyclist) (1903–69), Lithuanian cyclist
- Vladas Jankauskas (painter) (1923–83), Lithuanian painter

== See also ==
- Caitlin Yankowskas (born 1990), American pair skater
- Guntis Jankovskis (born 1971), Latvian chess master
