= Jankowski =

Jankowski (Polish pronunciation: [janˈkɔfski]; feminine: Jankowska; plural: Jankowscy) is the 13th most common surname in Poland (69,280 people in 2009). Many village estates were named Jankowa or Jankowice in 13th and 14th century Poland, producing at least twelve unrelated families with this surname. Over thirty place names with 'Jankow' (derived from Jan (John)) as a prefix remain in modern Poland. In most cases, the originator of the surname was a landowner of a reasonably sized estate (tens of hectares as a minimum but could be over one thousand hectares). Landowners often formed their surnames by adding the suffix '-ski', meaning 'of', to the estate name. They generally had considerable prestige and legal rights as the use of '-ski' indicated their adoption into the Polish nobility termed szlachta. To distinguish the different Jankowski szlachta families, they each used an additional identifier signifying their armorial crest or clan, termed 'herb' in Polish (see Boniecki, "Herbarsz Polski").

== Related surnames ==
Language	Masculine	Feminine
Polish	Jankowski	Jankowska
Belarusian (Romanization)	Янкоўскі (Yankouski, Jankoŭski)	Янкоўская (Yankouskaya, Jankoŭskaja)
Bulgarian (Romanization)	Янковски (Yankovski, Jankovski)	Янковска (Yankovska, Jankovska)
Czech/Slovak	Jankovský	Jankovská
Hungarian	Jankovszky, Jankovszki	
Latvian	Jankovskis	
Lithuanian	Jankauskas	Jankauskienė (married); Jankauskaitė (unmarried)
Macedonian	Јанковски (Jankovski)	Јанковска (Jankovska)
Romanian	Iancovschi	
Russian (Romanization)	Янковский (Yankovskiy, Yankovsky, Yankovski, Iankovskii, Iankovski, Iankovskiy, Jankovskij)	Янковская (Yankovskaya, Yankovskaia, Iankovskaia, Jankovskaja)
Ukrainian (Romanization)	Янковський (Yankovskyi, Yankovskyy, Yankovsky, Iankovskyi, Jankovskyj)	Янковська (Yankovska, Iankovska, Jankovska)
Other	Jankowsky, Jankouskas, Jankofsky; Yankowski, Yankowsky, Yankofsky	

== People ==
=== Jankowski/Jankowska ===
- Bruce Jankowski (born 1948), American football player
- Denny Jankowski (born 1983), German politician
- Franciszek Kotus-Jankowski (1891–1958), Polish politician and revolutionary
- Henryk Jankowski (1936–2010), Polish Catholic priest
- Horst Jankowski (1936–1998), German pianist
- Jacek Jankowski (born 1969), Polish diplomat
- Jadwiga Jankowska-Cieślak (1951–2025), Polish film actress
- Jan Moor-Jankowski (1924–2005), Polish-American zoologist and resistance fighter in World War II
- Jan Stanisław Jankowski (1882–1953), Polish politician and resistance leader in World War II
- Janusz Jankowski (born 1961), British physician
- Jerzy Jankowski (born 1920), Polish racer and car designer
- Katarzyna Jankowska (born 1994), Polish athlete
- Lou Jankowski (1931–2010), Canadian ice hockey player
- Maciej Jankowski (born 1990), Polish footballer
- Marian Jankowski (1931–2017), Polish weightlifter
- Mark Jankowski (born 1994), Canadian ice hockey player
- Martin Jankowski (born 1965), German writer and poet
- Michał Jankowski (1842–1912), Polish naturalist
- Mike Jankowski (born 1976), American skiing and snowboarding coach
- Miłosz Jankowski (born 1990), Polish rower
- Paul Jankowski (born 1950), American historian
- Roman Jankowski (born 1957), Polish speedway rider
- Ron Yankowski (born 1946), American football player
- Stanisław Jankowski (1911–2002), Polish military officer and architect
- Tadeusz Jankowski (1930–2022), Polish cross-country skier
- Thomas Jankowski (born 1989), Polish international rugby union player
- Travis Jankowski (born 1991), American baseball player
- Wojciech Jankowski (born 1963), Polish rower
- Zenon Jankowski (born 1937), Polish astronaut

=== Other forms ===
- Caitlin Yankowskas (born 1990), American pair skater
- Carl Yankowski (1948–2023), American business executive
- George Yankowski (1922–2020), American baseball player
- Guntis Jankovskis (born 1971), Latvian chess master

== See also ==
- Janowski
- Jankowskia
- Janikowski
