= Bezverkhovo =

Bezverkhovo (Russian: Безверхово) is the name of three rural localities in Russia:

- Bezverkhovo, Moscow Oblast, a hamlet in Solnechnogorsky District of Moscow Oblast
- Bezverkhovo, Primorsky Krai, a village in Khasansky District of Primorsky Krai
