= Yankovsky =

Yankovsky, feminine: Yankovskaya is the Russian form of the Polish surname Jankowski. Notable people with the surname include:

- Filipp Yankovsky (born 1968), Russian actor
- George Yankovsky (1879–1956), Russian tiger hunter
- Igor Yankovsky (1951–2025), Russian actor, son of Rostislav and nephew of Oleg
- Ivan Yankovsky
- Lidiya Yankovskaya (born 1986), Russian-American opera and symphonic conductor
- Mykola Yankovsky
- Oleg Yankovsky (1944–2009), Russian actor
- Rostislav Yankovsky (1930–2016), Soviet actor, brother of Oleg
- Valery Yankovsky (1911–2010), Russian writer
