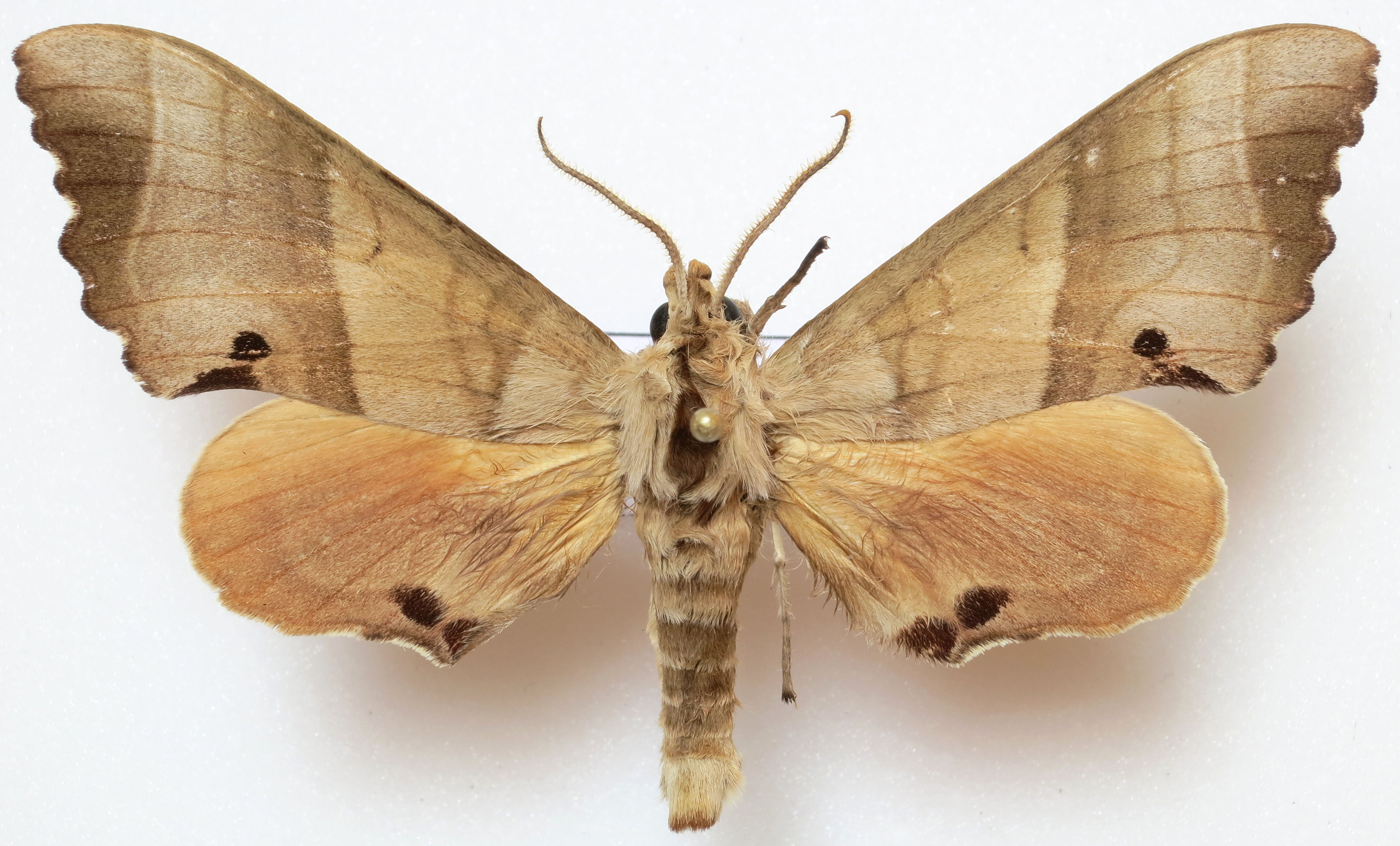
- From Primorsky Krai

Scientific classification
- Domain: Eukaryota
- Kingdom: Animalia
- Phylum: Arthropoda
- Class: Insecta
- Order: Lepidoptera
- Family: Sphingidae
- Genus: Marumba
- Species: M. jankowskii

Binomial name
- Marumba jankowskii (Oberthur, 1880)

Synonyms
- Smerinthus jankowskii Oberthür, 1880; Marumba jankovskii Kuznetsova, 1906; Marumba jankowskii bergmani Bryk, 1946

= Marumba jankowskii =

Species of moth

Marumba jankowskii is a species of moth of the family Sphingidae first described by Charles Oberthür in 1880. It is known from south-eastern Russian Far East, north-eastern China, North Korea, South Korea and Japan.

The wingspan is 68–80 mm. Adults are on wing from early June to late August in Korea.

The larvae feed on Tilia species, including T. mandshurica.

The species is named after the collector Michał Jankowski.
