= Janikowski =

Janikowski (Polish pronunciation: [jaɲiˈkɔfski]; feminine: Janikowska, plural: Janikowscy) is a Polish surname. Notable people with this name include:

- Andrzej Janikowski (1799–1864), Polish physician
- Damian Janikowski (born 1989), Polish wrestler
- Leopold Janikowski (1855–1942), Polish explorer and ethnographer
- Jerzy Janikowski (1952–2006), Polish fencer
- Sebastian Janikowski (born 1978), Polish former American football player
- Stanisław Janikowski (1891–1965), Polish diplomat
- Henryk Janikowski Polish player of soccer (Pilka Nozna)

== See also ==
- Jankowski
