= Valery Yankovsky =

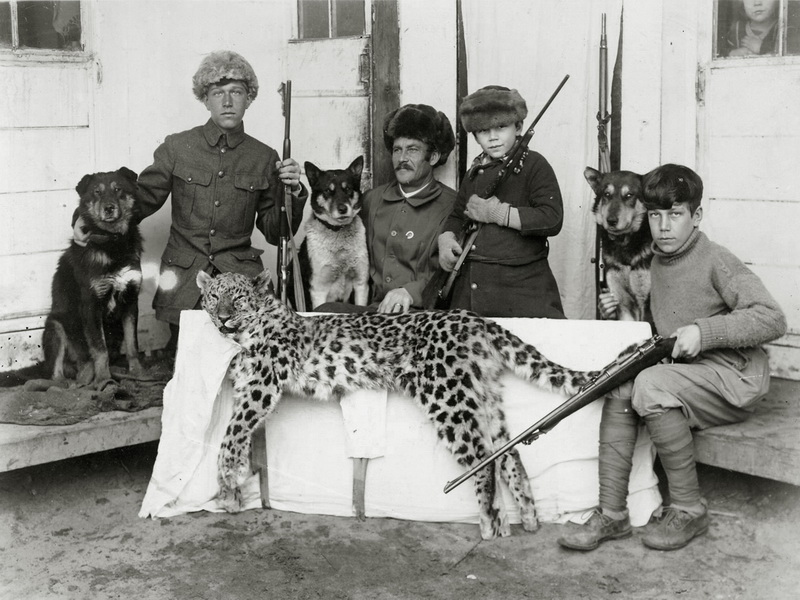
Valery (on the left) with his father George and siblings as a boy

Valery G. Yankovsky (May 15 (28), 1911 – April 17, 2010) was a Polish-origin Russian writer and a sharpshooter. Born in the Russian Far East, his family moved to what is now North Korea, where he spent many years in the Gulags. There he wrote many accounts of his family and life in the region.

== Biography ==
Yankovksy was born in the Vladivostok region to Yuri and Margarita, daughter of the shipping entrepreneur Mikhail G. Shevelev. His grandfather was the Polish settler Michał Jankowski. At an early age he began to hunt with his parents and earned a reputation for sharpshooting. He was nicknamed "nenuni sonja" by the local Koreans as his grand father had been called "nenuni" or four-eyed for his legendary skills and supposed sixth-sense while out hunting. In 1922, the family moved to northern Korea where they established Novina and Lukomorye resorts near Chongjin. When the Japanese occupied Korea, the family supplied meat to the Japanese army. Valery went to study at the Harbin Men's Gymnasium followed by studies at the Forestry College in Pyongyang. An unconfirmed story goes that the Japanese police who knew his sharpshooting and hunting skills once showed him a photograph of a rebel hiding in the local forests and offered him a bounty of 10000 yen for his head. Valery purportedly declined due to sympathies with the locals and many years later learned that this target had been Kim Il Sung. In 1944, he moved to Manchuria and 1945 onwards he worked in the Soviet Army serving as a translator with the knowledge of Japanese, Korean, and Russian. In 1946 he was arrested because of the family history, both as a White Russian and "for assisting the international bourgeoisie", since his family had supported the enemy, the Japanese army. He went to labour camp for six years, which was then extended to 10 years, and an attempt to escape led to a further extension to 25 years. During his sentence at the Gulags, he obtained through the camp management, information on his father and was able to exchange some correspondence. He was released in 1952 after which he worked in a mine in Chukotka and then at Magadan as a forester. He married Vera Maslakova (1912-1980) in Harbin in 1943, but the marriage did not last. In 1944 he married Irma Mayer (1924-1997) and they had a son Sergei. But after his arrest his wife was unable to contact him and she moved to Canada along with her son. He was rehabilitated in 1957 and he married Irina Kazimirovna Piotrovskaya (1924-2010) and moved to lived in Vladimir in 1968 after their son was born. He was in communication with his sisters Musa and Victoria who lived in the United States of America. In 1986, under Mikhail Gorbachev's relaxation of rules, he was allowed to visit Canada and he met his first wife Irma and his son, then aged forty. The family also had a reunion when a statue of his grandfather was unveiled on September 15, 1991 in the village Bezverkhovo. Attendees included Valery, his son Arseny, sister Victoria, her son and two grandchildren, a grandson of Captain Fridolf Heck, and staff from the Arsenyev Museum.

A member of the Union of Writers of the USSR he published several stories and published in magazines. He was awarded the Order of the Patriotic War, 2nd degree, "For the victory over Japan".

== Writings ==
Yankovsky wrote mainly in Russian, two of his major books have been translated into English.

- Escape, A True Story (2008)
- From The Crusades to Gulag and Beyond (2007) a translation of От гроба Господня до Гроба ГУЛАГа: Воспоминания (2000)

Other works include:

- В поисках женьшеня (1971) [Finding Ginseng]
- Нэнуни четырехглазый: Повесть (1979) [Nenuni the four-eyed: A Tale]
- Потомки Нэнуни: Повесть и рассказы (1986) [Descendants of Nenuni: A Tale and Stories]
- Полуостров: Повесть (1989) [Peninsula: A Tale]
- Мой отец Юрий Янковский (1990) [My father Yuri Yankovsky]
- На берегах Великого или Тихого: Путевые заметки (1990) [On the shores of the Great or the Pacific: Travel notes]
- Долгое возвращение. Автобиографическая повесть. (1991) [Long comeback. Autobiographical story. ]
- Тигр, олень, женьшень (1993) [Tiger, deer, ginseng: (Stories)]
- В горах Кореи (1993) [In the mountains of Korea]
- Новина. Рассказы и были (1995) [Novina. Stories.]
- Охота и охотничье хозяйство (1968–2004)
- На Севере Дальнем (1970) [In the Far North]
- Вокруг света (1971, 1973) [Around the World ]
- Уральский следопыт (1971) [Ural Ranger]
- Дальний Восток (с 1984) [Far East]
- Муравейник [Anthill]
- Атлантида [Atlantis]
- Местное время (2001, 2004) [Local time]
