= Pankowski =

Pankowski is a surname. Notable people with the surname include:

- Annie Pankowski (born 1994), American ice hockey player
- Marian Pankowski (1919–2011), Polish writer, poet, literary critic and translator
- Rafał Pankowski (born 1976), Polish sociologist and political scientist

== See also ==
- Jankowski
