= Albert Wilder Taylor =

American businessman (1875–1948)

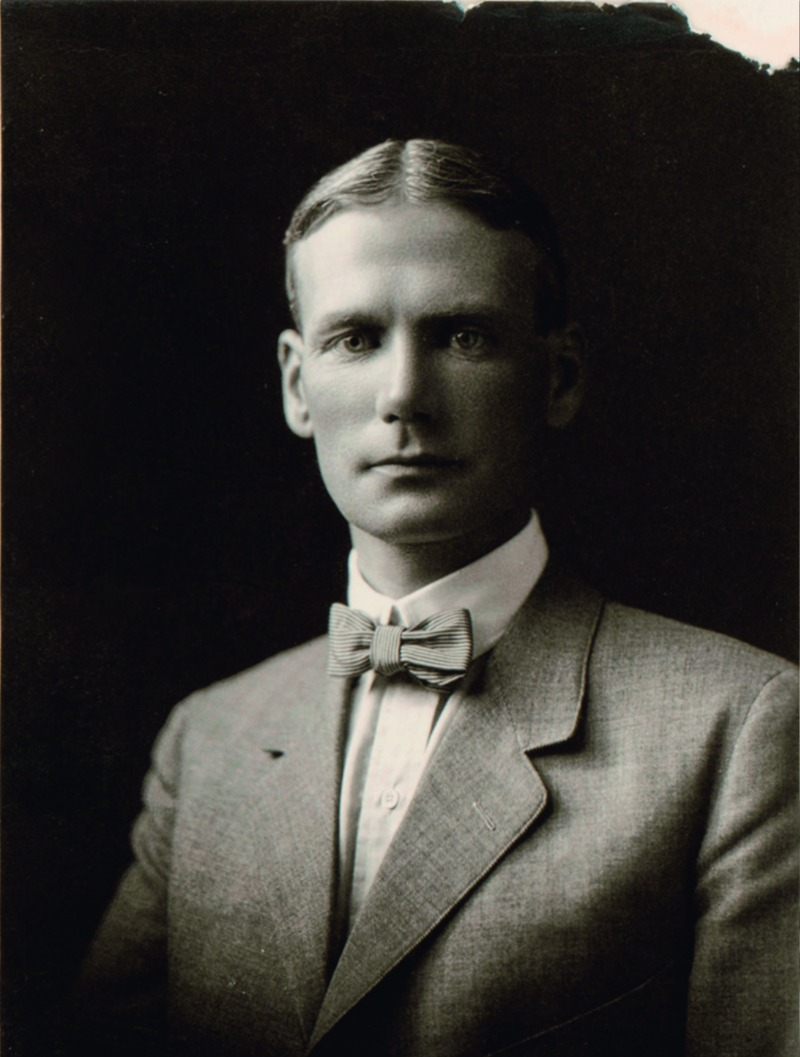

Albert Wilder "Bruce" Taylor (March 14, 1875 – June 29, 1948) was an American businessman and a correspondent for the United Press International and Associated Press who lived in Korea during its Japanese colonial period. During the 1919 March First Movement, he was able to inform the Western world about the Korean Declaration of Independence. His home in Seoul, where he lived with his wife Mary Linley Taylor, named as "Dilkusha" was restored as a museum in 2021.

== Life and work ==
Taylor was born in Silver City, Nevada, to gold miner George Alexander and Mary Etta (Lord) Taylor. Along with his father he visited Joseon (Korea) in 1896 and received a license to mine in Pyeongan Province. George managed the Dongyang Mining Company which ran the Unsan Gold Mine. After the death of his father in 1908 Albert stayed on as manager in the Jiksan Mining Company while also becoming a correspondent for Associated Press. In 1912 Albert and his brother William established Taylor Company and the Taylor Antique Store. The company was involved in the sale of American cars in Korea including Ford, General Motors and Chevrolet. The antique store sold furniture, ceramics and traditional craft. In the 1930s his brother moved his business to China. In 1917 Taylor met the British stage actress Mary Linley who was on a world tour and they married in June in St. Thomas Cathedral in Mumbai. During their travels Mary visited Lucknow where she was impressed by the ruins of Dilkusha Kothi. The Taylors built a home of red-bricks beside a gingko tree in 1923 in Seoul and named it as "Dilkusha" (meaning "heart's delight"). In February 1919 their baby son was born in the foreigner's ward of the Severance Hospital and this was the period when Koreans were preparing for a movement against Japanese rule. A head nurse at the hospital had made use of the foreigner's ward to hide a copy of the Korean "declaration of Independence" under the bed of the infant and this was noticed by Albert. He gave it to his brother William and sent him off to Tokyo to relay it to the United States. Taylor subsequently covered the independence movement including the Jeamni massacre. In 1940, their son Bruce Tickell Taylor left to the United States and joined the US Army. Following rising tensions with the US in the Pacific, Taylor was arrested by the Japanese authorities and held at Seodaemun Prison for six months while his wife was placed under house arrest. They were deported to the US in May 1942. In 1945 he returned to Korea as an advisor to the US military forces and also to recover his belongings. In 1948 he began to work as a mining officer in California but died from a heart attack in California.
