= Lemyra jankowskii =

Scientific classification
- Domain: Eukaryota
- Kingdom: Animalia
- Phylum: Arthropoda
- Class: Insecta
- Order: Lepidoptera
- Superfamily: Noctuoidea
- Family: Erebidae
- Subfamily: Arctiinae
- Genus: Lemyra
- Species: L. jankowskii

Binomial name
- Lemyra jankowskii (Oberthür, 1881)

Synonyms
- Spilosoma jankowskii Oberthür, [1881]; Diacrisia jankowskii korearctia Bryk, 1948; Spilosoma jankowskii var. soror Leech, 1899; Diacrisia vialis Oberthür, 1911

Species of insect

Lemyra jankowskii is a moth of the family Erebidae. It was described by Oberthür in 1881. It is found in China (Sichuan, Shaanxi, Shanxi, Jiangsu, Zhejiang, Yunnan, Heilongjiang, Liaonin, Hebei, Shandong, Tibet, Jilin, Beijing, Qinghai, Hubei, Guangxi), south-eastern Russia and the southern Kuriles. The species is named after the collector Michał Jankowski from whose specimens it was described.

== Subspecies ==
- Lemyra jankowskii jankowskii (Russia, the Kuriles, China: Heilongjiang, Liaonin, Jilin, Shandong)
- Lemyra jankowskii soror (Leech, 1899) (Sichuan, Yunnan, Tibet, Shaanxi, Shanxi, Jiangsu, Zhejiang, Hebei, Beijing, Qinghai, Hubei, Guangxi)
