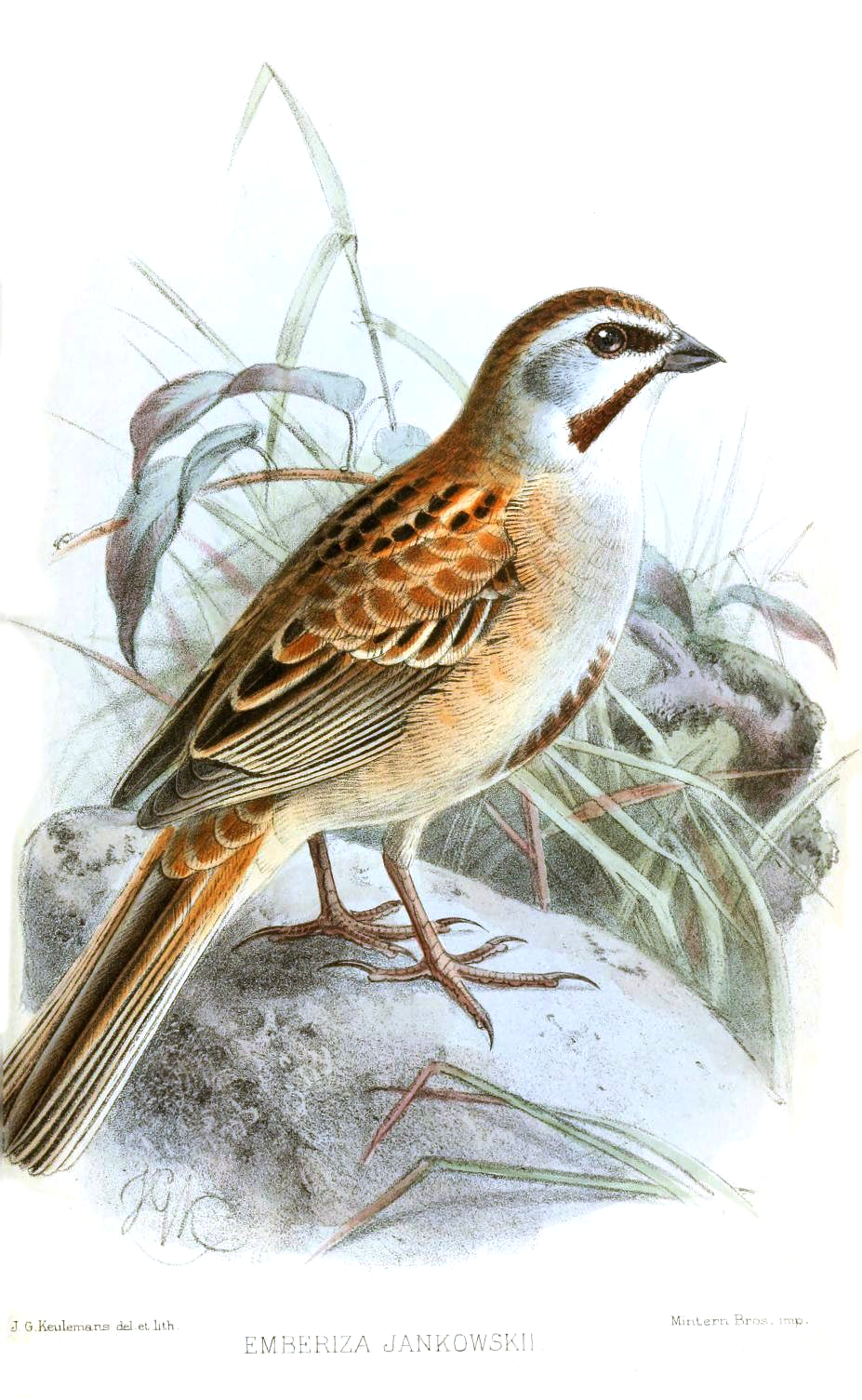

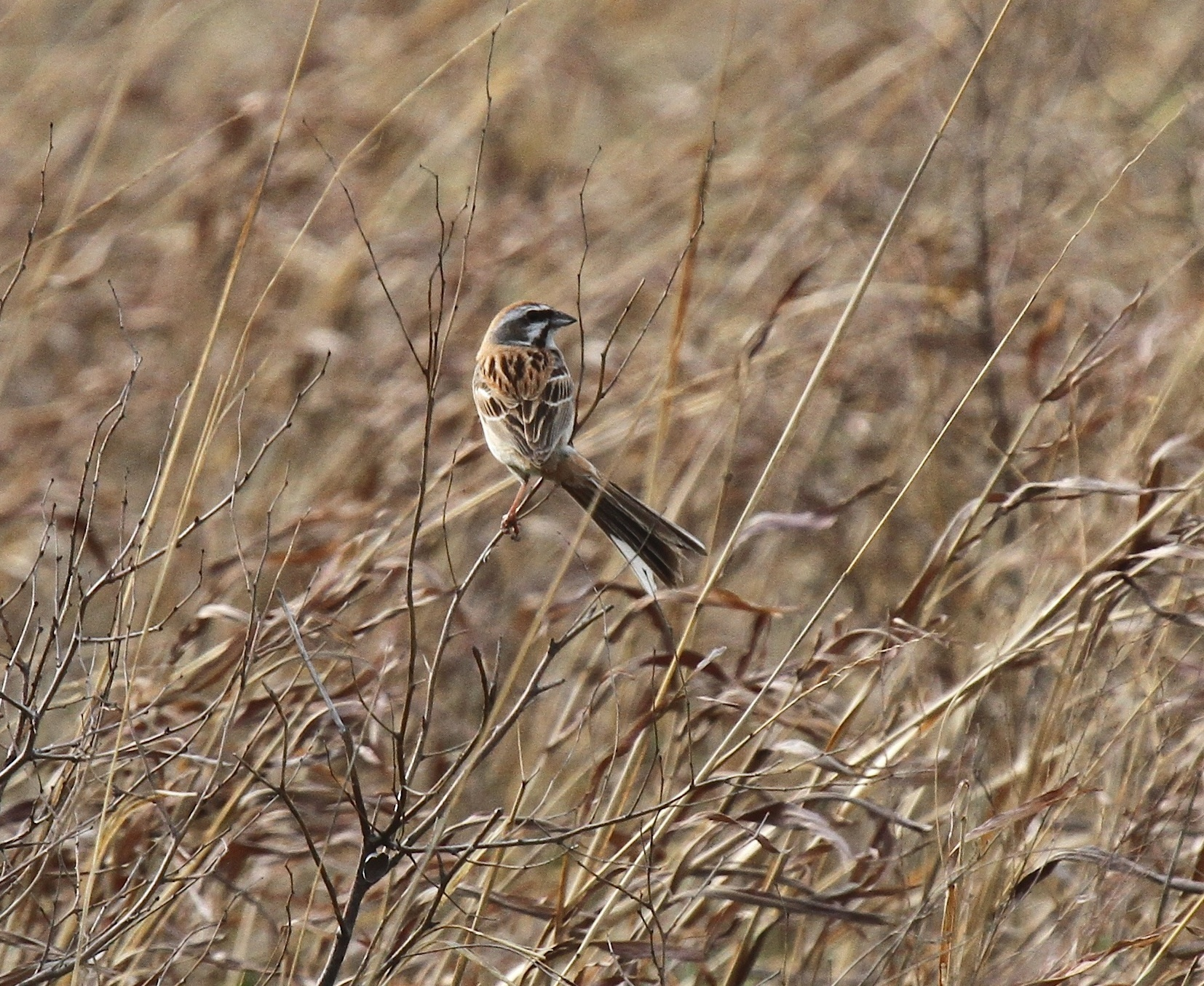

Conservation status
- Endangered (IUCN 3.1)

Scientific classification
- Kingdom: Animalia
- Phylum: Chordata
- Class: Aves
- Order: Passeriformes
- Family: Emberizidae
- Genus: Emberiza
- Species: E. jankowskii

Binomial name
- Emberiza jankowskii Taczanowski, 1888

= Jankowski's bunting =

Species of bird

Jankowski's bunting or rufous-backed bunting (Emberiza jankowskii) is a species of bird in the family Emberizidae.

It breeds in the Russian Far East, Manchuria and far northeastern Korea, where its natural habitats are temperate shrubland and grassland. In 2020 it was discovered to be breeding in Mongolia. The species is threatened by habitat loss, caused by overgrazing and changes in agriculture. It is currently listed as endangered.

The bird's English name honours the Polish collector Michał Jankowski, who collected a specimen on 9 March 1886 on his estate in Sidemi in the Primorsky Krai. The specimen was sent to Ladislaus Taczanowski who described the species in 1888.

Jankowski's bunting is given the highest level of protection under Chinese law, being added to the list of species named under the Wildlife Protection Law in 2021.
