= Dilkusha, Lucknow =

Colony in Lucknow, Uttar Pradesh, India

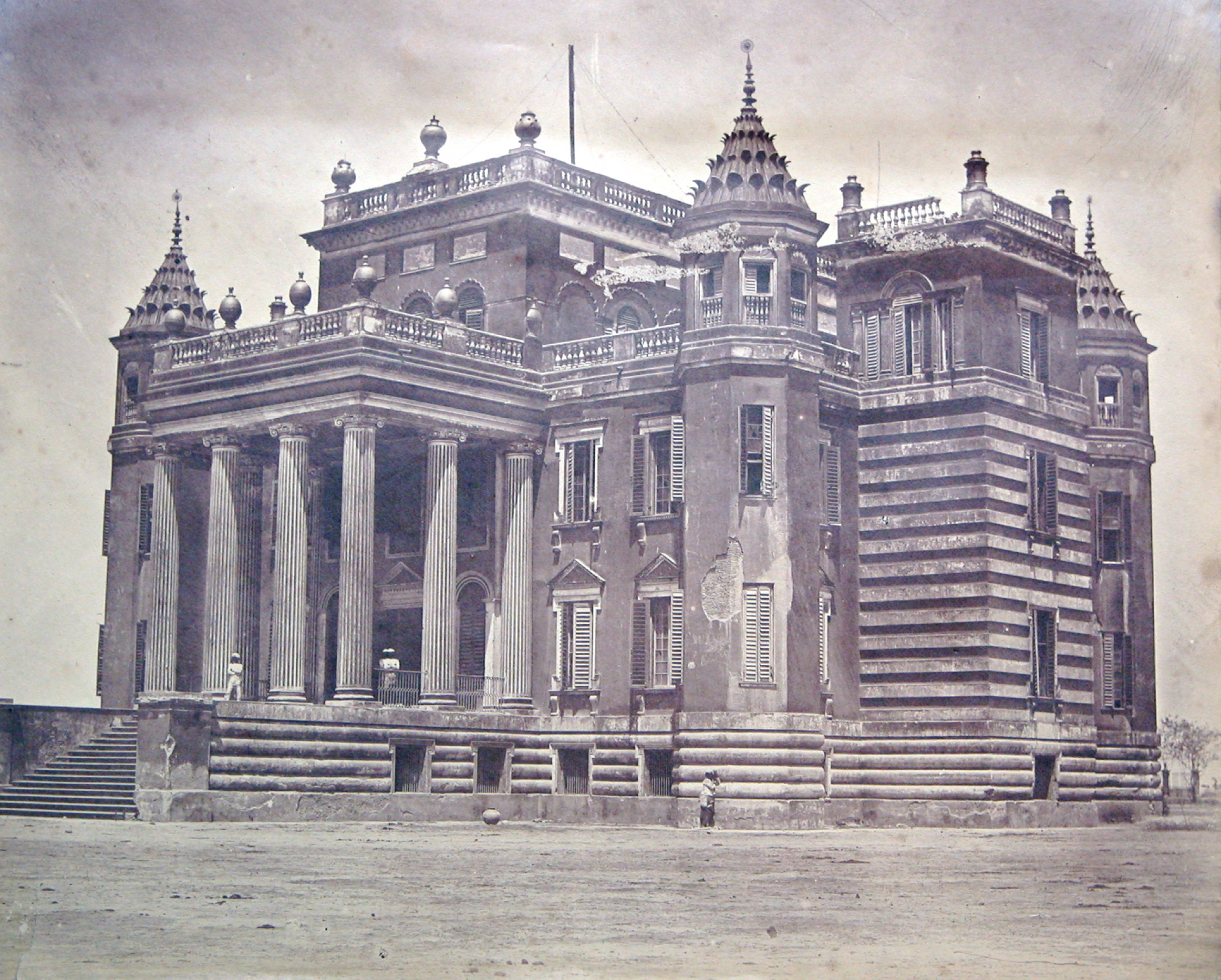
Dilkusha Kothi in 1858, photographed by Felice Beato

Dilkusha is a colony in Lucknow, the capital city of Uttar Pradesh, India.
