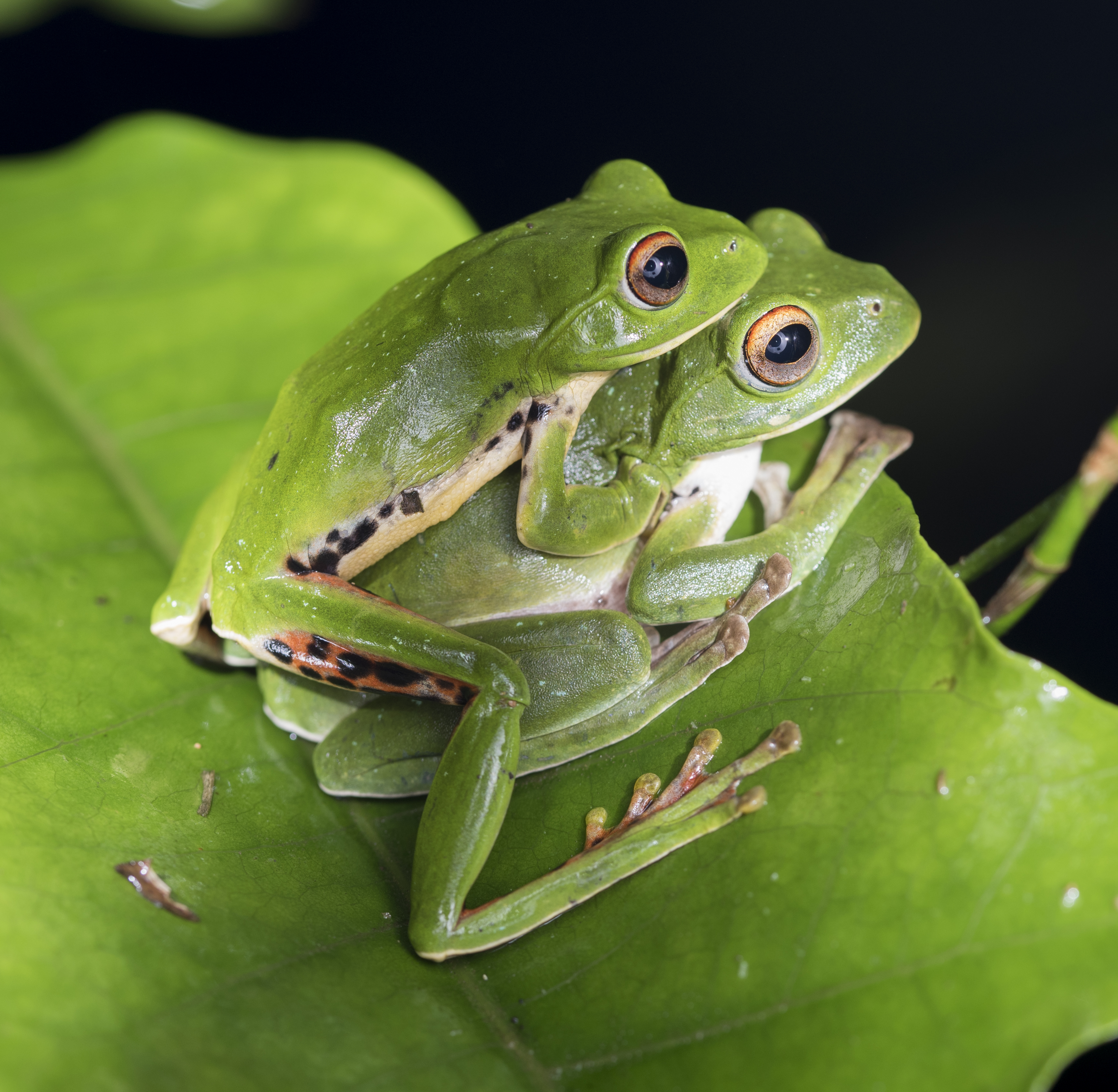
- In amplexus; Lugu, Nantou, Taiwan

Conservation status
- Least Concern (IUCN 3.1)

Scientific classification
- Kingdom: Animalia
- Phylum: Chordata
- Class: Amphibia
- Order: Anura
- Family: Rhacophoridae
- Genus: Zhangixalus
- Species: Z. moltrechti

Binomial name
- Zhangixalus moltrechti (Boulenger, 1908)

Synonyms
- Rhacophorus moltrechti Boulenger, 1908; Rhacophorus schlegelii moltrechti — Wolf, 1936

= Zhangixalus moltrechti =

Species of amphibian

Zhangixalus moltrechti is a species of frog in the family Rhacophoridae. It is endemic to Taiwan, where it has a wide distribution in hilly areas. Common names Moltrecht's green treefrog, Moltrecht's treefrog, Taiwan treefrog, and Nantou flying frog have been coined for it.

== Etymology ==
The name of the genus honors Zhang Ya-Ping from the Chinese Academy of Sciences, in recognition to his contributions to biodiversity and evolution research in China, in combination with ixalus, a common generic root for treefrogs. The specific name moltrechti honors Arnold Moltrecht, a Latvian entomologist, lepidopterist, and ophthalmologist; while stationed in Vladivostok he also traveled and collected in Taiwan.

== Description ==
Zhangixalus moltrechti is a medium-sized tree frog, females are 5–6 cm (2.0–2.4 in) in snout-vent length; males are slightly smaller, 3.6–4.2 cm (1.4–1.7 in). The finger and toe tips have well-developed discs. Skin is smooth. The overall coloration is green; some individuals have few white spots. The belly is white yellow. The hidden surfaces of the hind legs are red or orange with black spots. The iris is orange red.

== Habitat and conservation ==
Zhangixalus moltrechti occurs in forests, orchards, and tea plantations between 0 and 2500 meters above sea level. Breeding takes place in bodies of standing water, such as ponds, pools, cisterns, and blocked roadside ditches. The female frog lays eggs in caves, under cover, or on plants near the water. After hatching the rain pushes the tadpoles into the water. It may also breed in pools of intermittent streams, potholes, and streamside pools. High-elevation (~2,000 m (6,600 ft)) populations breed in spring and summer (April–September), whereas low-elevation (<500 m (1,600 ft)) populations breed in late autumn to early spring (October–March); mid-elevation populations breed throughout the year, with peak in spring. The eggs are laid in foam nests above the water, attached to branches of trees, bushes, or walls.

The IUCN classifies this frog as least concern of extinction.

== See also ==
- List of protected species in Taiwan
- List of endemic species of Taiwan
