= Fridolf Heck =

Finnish mariner

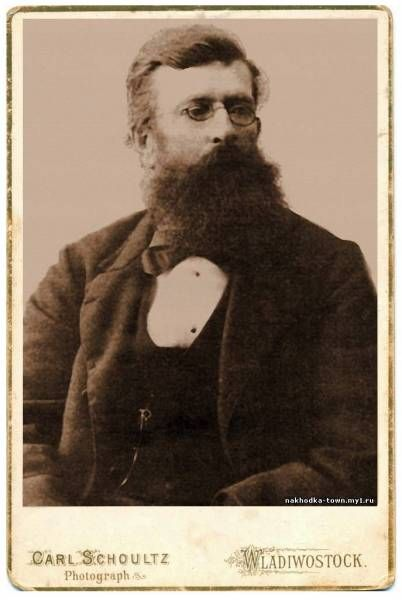

Fridolf Fabian Heck the surname also rendered as Höök (Scandinavian form) or Fridolf Kirilovich Gek (Russian: Фридольф Кириллович Гек) (December 30, 1836 – July 4, 1904) was a Finnish naval captain, whaler, free trader, and settler in the Russian Ussuri krai.

== Biography ==
Heck was born in Ekenäs to Lieutenant Erik (1792–1848) and Ulrika Charlotta Sofia Aminoff (1806–1885). A brother was the canal engineer Berndt. Fridolf went to work on a ship at the age of thirteen and became a boatsteerer on the Russo-Finnish whaleship Graf Berg in 1857 and a sea captain in 1863 from Turku Maritime School. He took an offer during the famine period of 1862-68 from Alexander II of Russia for Finns to settle freely beyond the Amur River. He established a settlement in between Nakhodka and Vladivostok in 1868 but the colony fell apart by 1870. He continued to live in the Far East on Askold Island where he hired Michał Jankowski. In June 1879, their settlement was attacked by Hunhuz bandits and his wife was murdered, along with his son and several workers. He married an Ussuri Cosack in 1884 and along with the Bryner (Julius Ivanovich Bryner was the grandfather of Yul Brynner) and Jankowski families, they established the village of Bezverkhovo.

Heck took an interest in the ethnography of the region, while also mapping the area. He began to collect artifacts for the museum in Vladivostok.

He suffered a mental illness and shot himself on July 4, 1904. He was buried in Pokrovsky cemetery in Vladivostok but in 1986, shifted to the Marine Cemetery. Several places in the Kamchatka peninsula are named after him including Cape Geka and Geka Bay.
