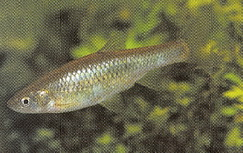

Scientific classification
- Kingdom: Animalia
- Phylum: Chordata
- Class: Actinopterygii
- Order: Cypriniformes
- Suborder: Cyprinoidei
- Family: Xenocyprididae
- Genus: Pararasbora; Regan, 1908
- Species: P. moltrechti

Binomial name
- Pararasbora moltrechti Regan, 1908

Synonyms
- Aphyocypris moltrechti (Regan, 1908); Aphyocypris amnis T.-Y. Liao, S. O. Kullander & H.-D. Lin, 2011

= Pararasbora =

Species of fish

Pararasbora is a monospecific genus of freshwater ray-finned fish belonging to the family Xenocyprididae, the East Asian minnows or sharpbellies. The only species in the genus is Pararasbora moltrechti, Moltrecht's minnow. This species is endemic to Taiwan. It was formerly considered to be a species in the genus Aphyocypris. The Endemic Species Research Institute under the Council of Agriculture of the Executive Yuan in Taiwan has listed this species as a "precious and rare species" among other endemic freshwater species.

It is named in honor of physician-entomologist Arnold Moltrecht (1873–1952), who collected the type specimen.

Pararasbora moltrechti is distributed in the middle portion of western Taiwan, where they can be found in the Tachia River and Tatu River. Their total body length is usually from 4 cm to 8 cm.
