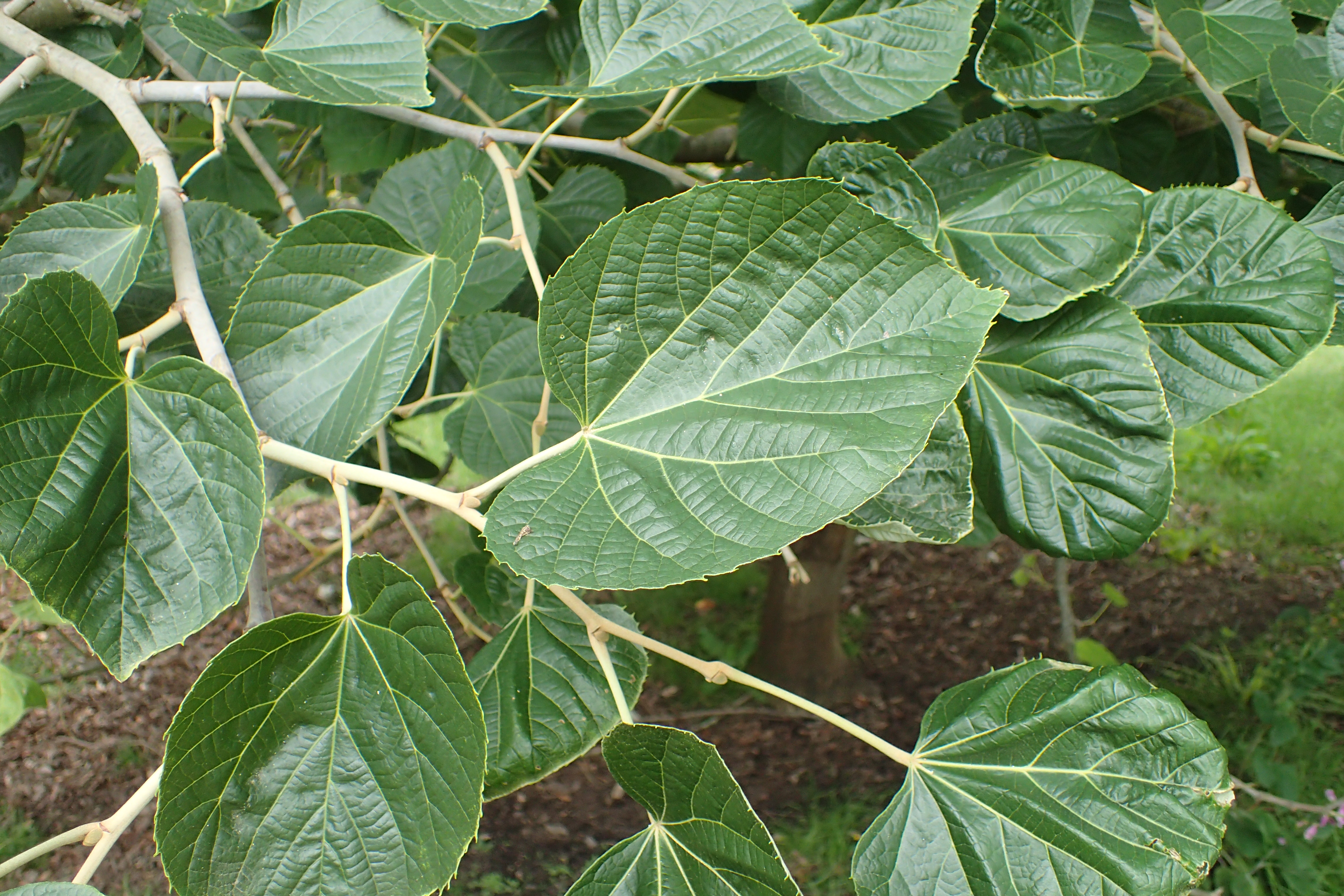
- At Hackfalls Arboretum

Scientific classification
- Kingdom: Plantae
- Clade: Tracheophytes
- Clade: Angiosperms
- Clade: Eudicots
- Clade: Rosids
- Order: Malvales
- Family: Malvaceae
- Genus: Tilia
- Species: T. mandshurica

Binomial name
- Tilia mandshurica Rupr. & Maxim.

Synonyms
- List: Tilia argentea Bayer; Tilia chugokuensis Hatus.; Tilia mandshurica f. depressa (Nakai) W.Lee; Tilia mandshurica f. villicarpa (Nakai) W.Lee; Tilia megaphylla Nakai; Tilia ovalis Nakai; Tilia rufovillosa Hatus.; Tilia semicostata Nakai

= Tilia mandshurica =

Species of flowering plant

Tilia mandshurica, the Manchurian linden or Manchurian lime, is a species of flowering plant in the family Malvaceae, native to China, the Korea Peninsula, Japan, and the Russian Far East. It is used as a street tree in its native range, and has potential elsewhere, but is susceptible to damage from late frosts.

== Subtaxa ==
The following varieties are accepted:

- Tilia mandshurica var. mandshurica
- Tilia mandshurica var. rufovillosa (Hatus.) Kitam. – Only on Mount Kujū, Kyushu, Japan
- Tilia mandshurica var. toriiana T.Yamaz. – Honshu, Japan
