= Thomas Jankowski =

Poland international rugby union player

- Born: 17 February 1989 (age 37) Hertfordshire, England
- Height: 6 ft 2 in (1.88 m)
- Weight: 99 kg (15 st 8 lb; 218 lb)

Rugby union career
- Position: Number 8 / Flanker
Amateur team(s)
Years	Team	Apps	(Points)
2006–2009	Welwyn RFC		
Senior career
Years	Team	Apps	(Points)
2009–	Ampthill RUFC / Las Vegas Blackjacks		
International career
Years	Team	Apps	(Points)
2010	Poland	8	

Thomas Jankowski (born 17 February 1989) is a Polish international rugby union player, playing for Las Vegas Blackjacks RUFC and the Poland national rugby union team.

== Career ==
Jankowski, who was eligible for the Polish national team due to the nationality of his grandfather, grew up in Hertfordshire, England, where at age 10 began to play rugby. He represented Hertfordshire at all age levels, and at age 18 was made captain of Hertfordshire under 20s, he also took up senior 1st team rugby early aged just 17.

In 2008 he moved to Bedfordshire to be educated at the University of Bedfordshire, receiving a BSc in Sport and Physical Education, receiving a full athletic scholarship during his time there. At the same time he signed for local club Ampthill and District RUFC . After winning the National League 3, he received an email from the Polish Union of Rugby of the proposal to play in white and red colors. He made his debut for Poland against Moldova on 13 November 2010. In winter 2012 Jankowski left England to play rugby for the Las Vegas Blackjacks for a season, before pursuing a career in the Arabian Gulf with Bahrain RFC.

Jankowski has also represented England at beach rugby via charity invitational team The Flair Bears, competing in the Lignano International Beach Rugby Cup.

Since making his debut Jankowski has missed two games for Poland, against the Netherlands (05.16.2011) and the Czech Republic (15/10/2011) due to injuries, however he has since returned, playing in Gdansk against Germany in winter 2011, and starting every game since.
