= George Yankovsky =

Russian tiger hunter (1879–1956)

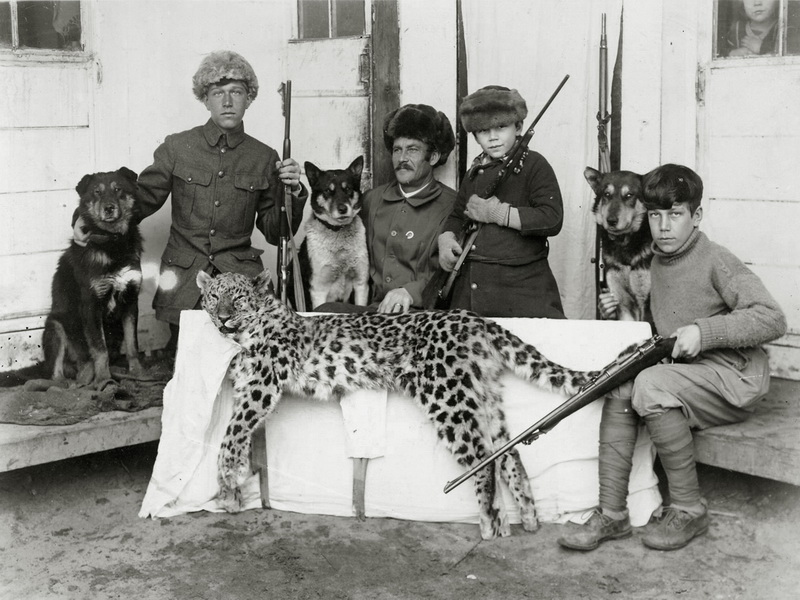
George and his children (Valery at left and Arseny at extreme right) with a dead leopard and Manchu huskies in Korea

George (Yuri or Jerzy) Mihailovich Yankovsky (Russian: Юрий Михайлович Янковский) (5 June 1879 - 13 June 1956) was a Russian tiger hunter in Manchuria, a son of the Polish settler in the Russian Far East, Michał Jankowski. The family moved from Sidemi, in Primorsky Krai across the border into northern Korea in 1922. After the Soviets entered northern Korea, he was arrested in 1945 and sent to the Siberian Gulags where he was able to meet his incarcerated father and died just weeks before he was to be released. He was known as one of the most prolific hunters of Amur tigers and wrote a book in 1940 called Полвека охоты на тигров [Half a Century of Tiger Hunting]. His life became better known to the English speaking world after a biography, The Tiger's Claw, was written in 1956 by the English actress in Korea, Mary Linley Taylor.

== Biography ==
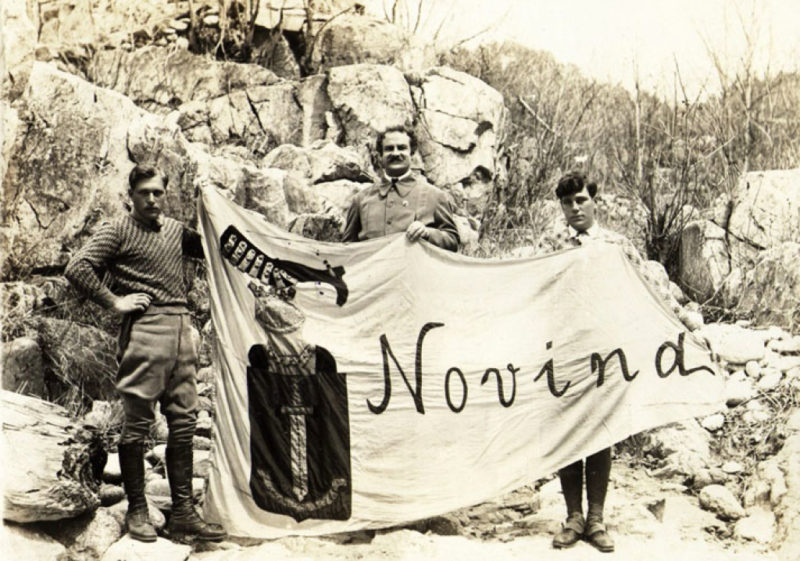
George with Valery and Arseny holding banner of Novina in Korea

Yuri was born on Askold Island to the Polish settler Michał Jankowski and Olga Kuzniecowa. At the age of twenty Yuri went to America along with his half-brother Alexander. He studied horse breeding in Texas, volunteered at the Agricultural University of Champaign, Illinois, and brought English purebreds by ship from San Francisco to his father's estate in Sidemi. Like the rest of the family, he was a keen hunter and became famous for shooting tigers that often came to prey on their horses. The Koreans in the Sidemi area called Yuri as “Nenuni Ateri” (the son of the four-eyed) as his father was called nenuni for his keen eyesight. Yuri married Margarita, the oldest daughter of the shipping entrepreneur Mikhail G. Shevelev in 1907 and they had three sons and two daughters. All the children learned to ride horses and George helped establish a race track in Vladivostok. In 1919, their daughter Muza raced in Vladivostok and won.

Following the Russian revolution, the Jankowski family had to leave their home in Sidemi, Primorsky Krai in 1922 and moved not far away from the border to northern Korea where George sold nearly all his belongings in Harbin. Some years later they established an estate called Novina. The family made this a resort, mainly for exiled Russians. As a young boy, Yul Brynner spent his summers at the resort. They also earned a living raising deer and horses as they had done before. When the Japanese moved into the Korean region, the family supplied meat to the army. His wife died in 1936 and he married again in 1941 to Olga Petrovna Archegova from Shanghai. In 1945, the Soviet army entered northern Korea and since they had been supporting the enemy, the Japanese troops, Yuri was arrested and sent to the Gulags. Some of the family including son Arseny, and daughters Victoria and Muza escaped through the south of Korea and then emigrated to the United States of America. Arseny, with his knowledge of Japanese, Korean, Russian and English, was recruited by the CIA on the recommendation of David Murphy and went under the name of Andy Brown, handling a network of Korean operatives including No Kum-sok. When many of his operatives were captured, a molehunt began within the CIA and several operatives including Arseny were dismissed. The others included a CIA officer, Edgar Snow, who was married to Anastasia "Nata" Sokolovskaya, daughter of Arseny's wife Olga Sokolovskaya from her earlier marriage. Another CIA operative who was dismissed was Vivian L. Parker, who had married, Marianne, a cousin of Arseny. As "White Russians" with no love for communism, the family held that Arseny's dismissal was unfair. George's son Valery was arrested by the Soviets and he managed to contact his father while in the Gulags. He survived and after rehabilitation, wrote several books on the life of the family. George died just two months before his release was due. George was posthumously rehabilitated on June 22, 1990.

=== Hunting and outdoor life ===
George's first experience with tigers was when he was taken by his father at the age of 11 to track a tiger that had killed one of their horses. In 1894 he went on a collecting expedition for butterflies to northern Korea along with his brother Alexander. This had been on the request of Grand Duke Nikolai Mikhailovich to his father. They had to put out sheets and lights to trap insects and one of the brothers had to stand on guard with a gun at the ready. His first tiger hunt was on their Yankovsky Peninsula with his brother and one of their workers Plato was injured when the wounded tiger attacked. He wrote of narrow escapes from leopards and tigers. The brothers also supplied specimens to the Staudinger & Bang-Haas natural history agents. In the fall of 1920 Yuri recorded that many bears from Manchuria entered the Sidemi area. Yuri wrote about his hunting in his 1940 book and had hoped to write more but the manuscripts which he kept while in labour camp which weighed two pounds are thought to have been burned after his death. His son Valery also wrote about his father's hunting.

A biography of George was published by Mary Linley Taylor in English as The Tiger's Claw: The Life-Story of George Yankovsky East Asia's Mighty Hunter in 1956.
