= Andrzej Janikowski =

Polish physician (1799–1864)

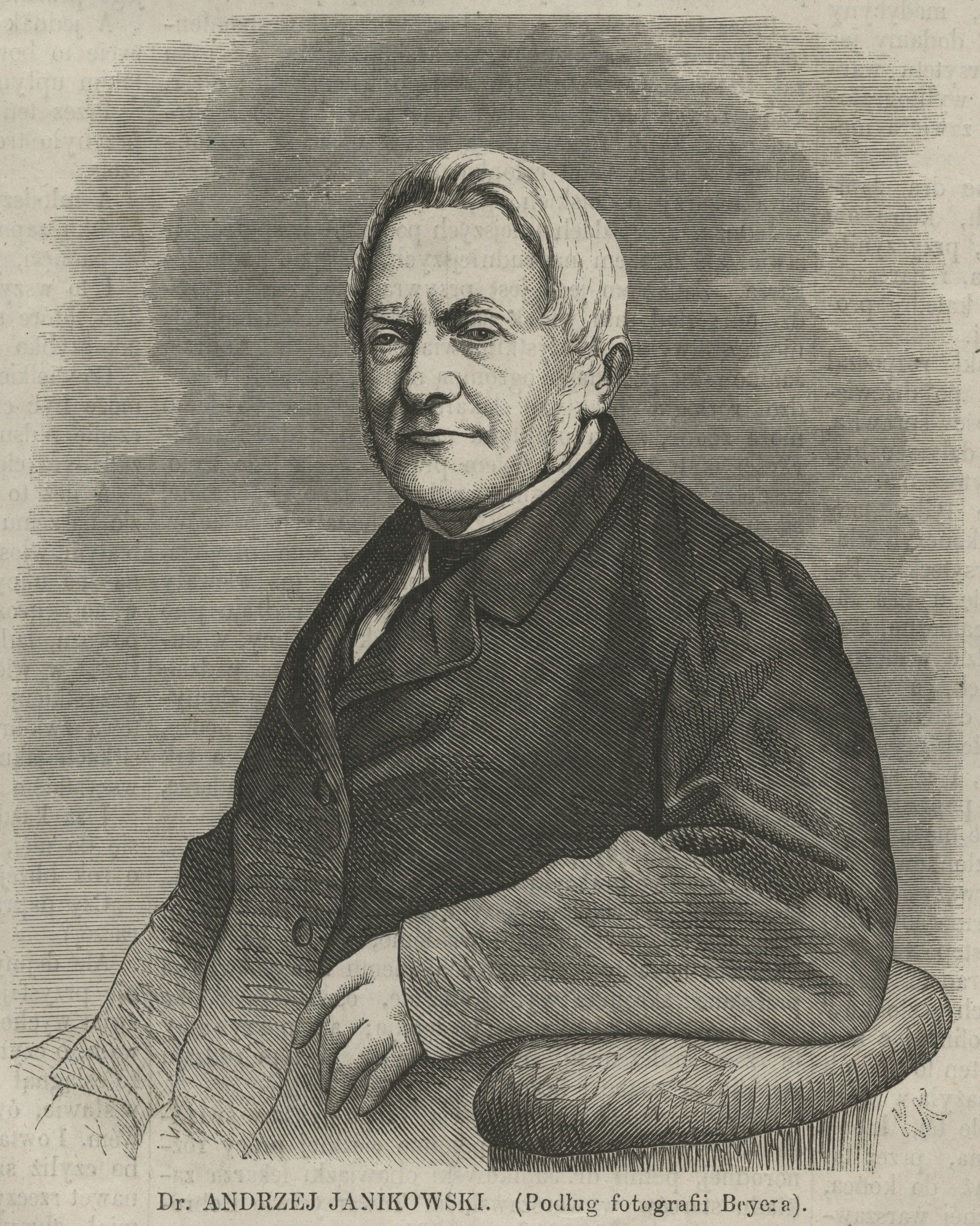
- Andrzej Janikowski
- Born: 23 November 1799
- Died: 4 December 1864 (aged 65); Warsaw
- Known for: forensic medicine in Poland

Andrzej Janikowski (November 23, 1799 – December 4, 1864) was a Polish-Russian medical doctor and professor of theoretical surgery at the University of Warsaw, a pioneer of forensic medicine in Poland of the nineteenth century.
