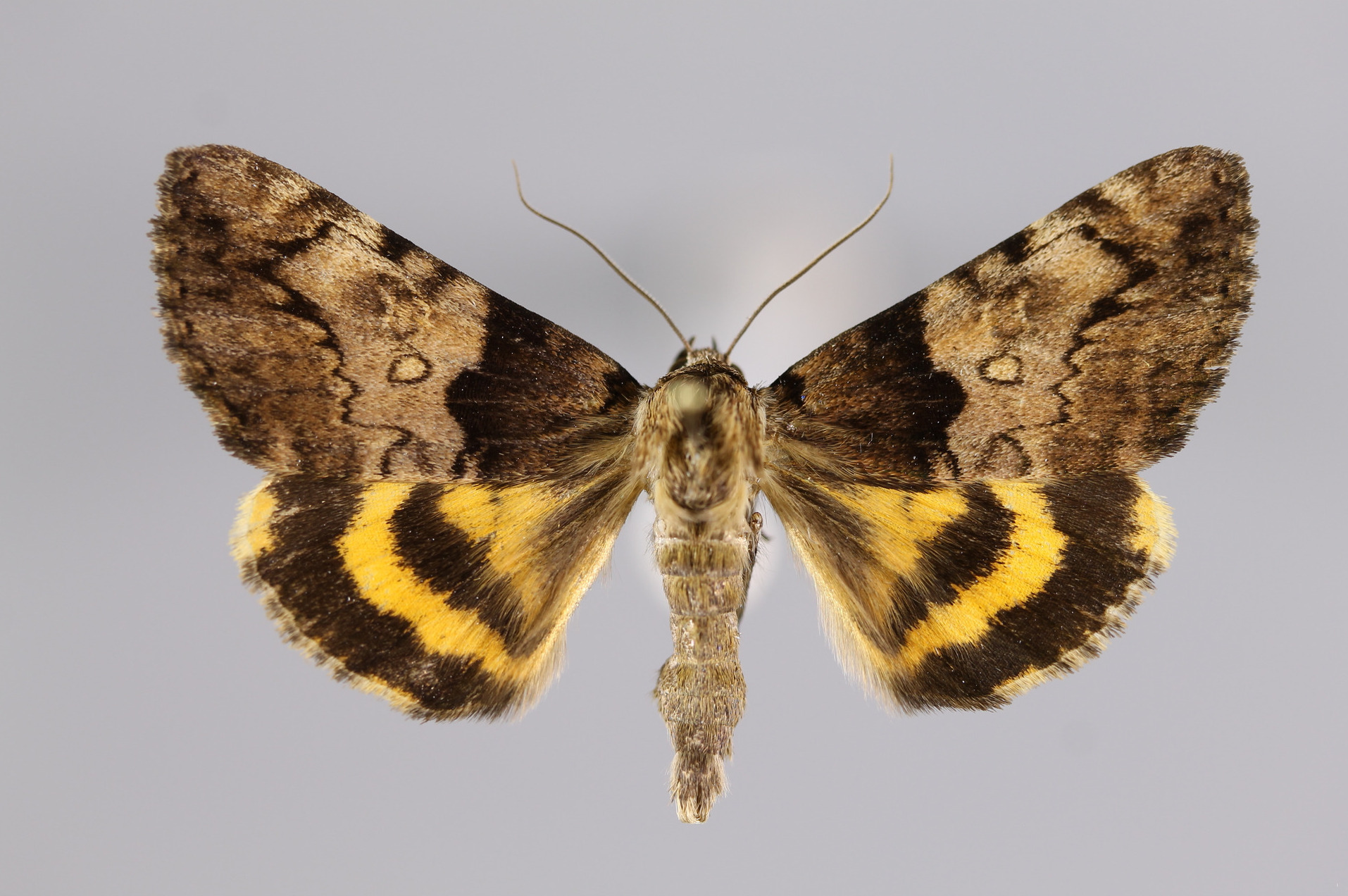

Scientific classification
- Kingdom: Animalia
- Phylum: Arthropoda
- Clade: Pancrustacea
- Class: Insecta
- Order: Lepidoptera
- Superfamily: Noctuoidea
- Family: Erebidae
- Genus: Catocala
- Species: C. moltrechti

Binomial name
- Catocala moltrechti O. Bang-Haas, 1927

= Catocala moltrechti =

Species of moth

Catocala moltrechti is a moth of the family Erebidae first described by Otto Bang-Haas in 1927. It is found in south-eastern Siberia.
