= Złotoria, Gmina Choroszcz =

Złotoria
- Village
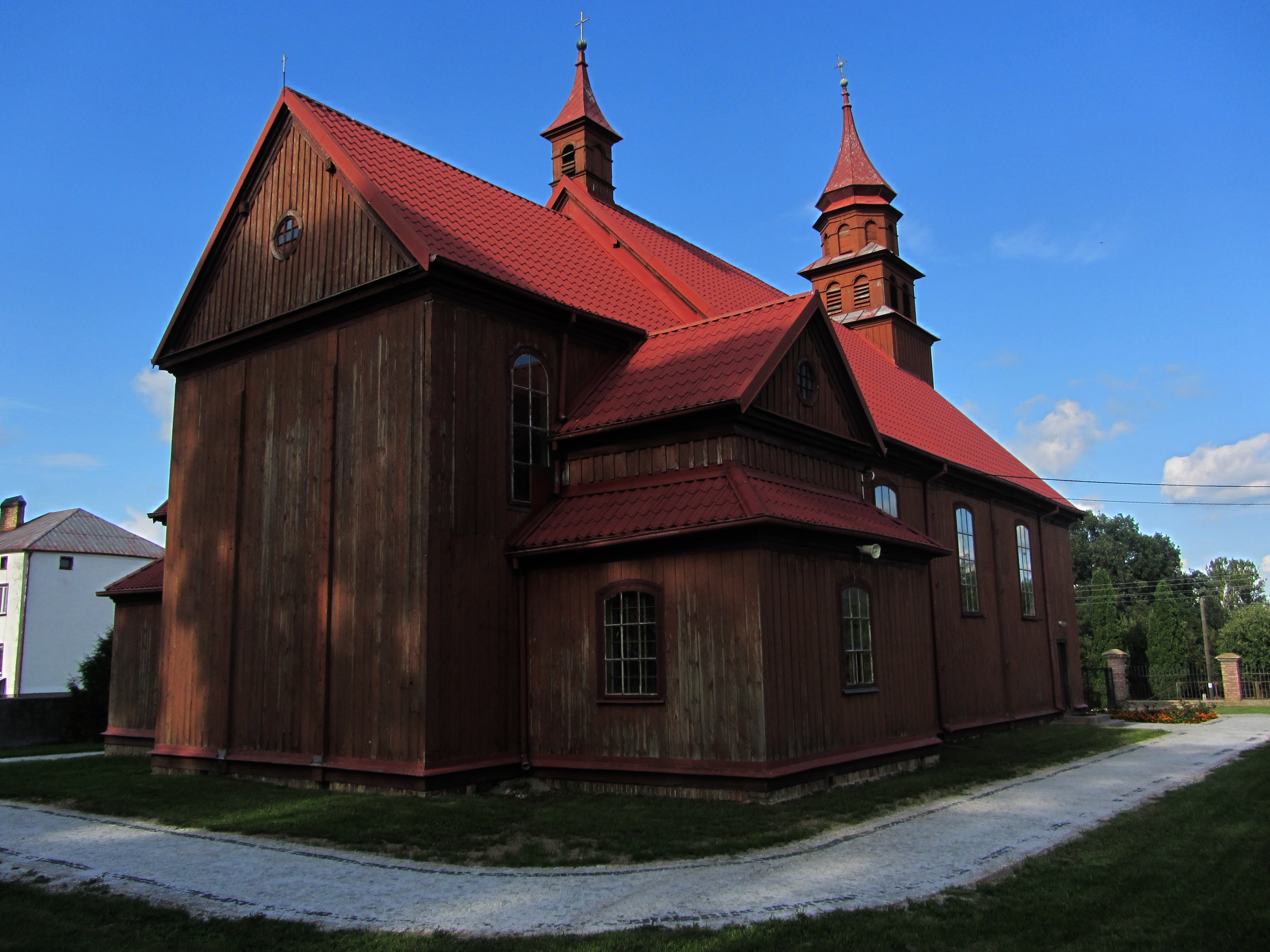

- Location within Poland
- Coordinates: 53°10′38″N 22°56′5″E
- Country: Poland
- Voivodeship: Podlaskie
- County: Białystok
- Gmina: Choroszcz
- Population: 767

Złotoria [zwɔˈtɔrja] is a village in the administrative district of Gmina Choroszcz, within Białystok County, Podlaskie Voivodeship, in north-eastern Poland.
