= Dilkusha Kothi =

18th century house in Lucknow, India

Coordinates: 26.831°N 80.954°E

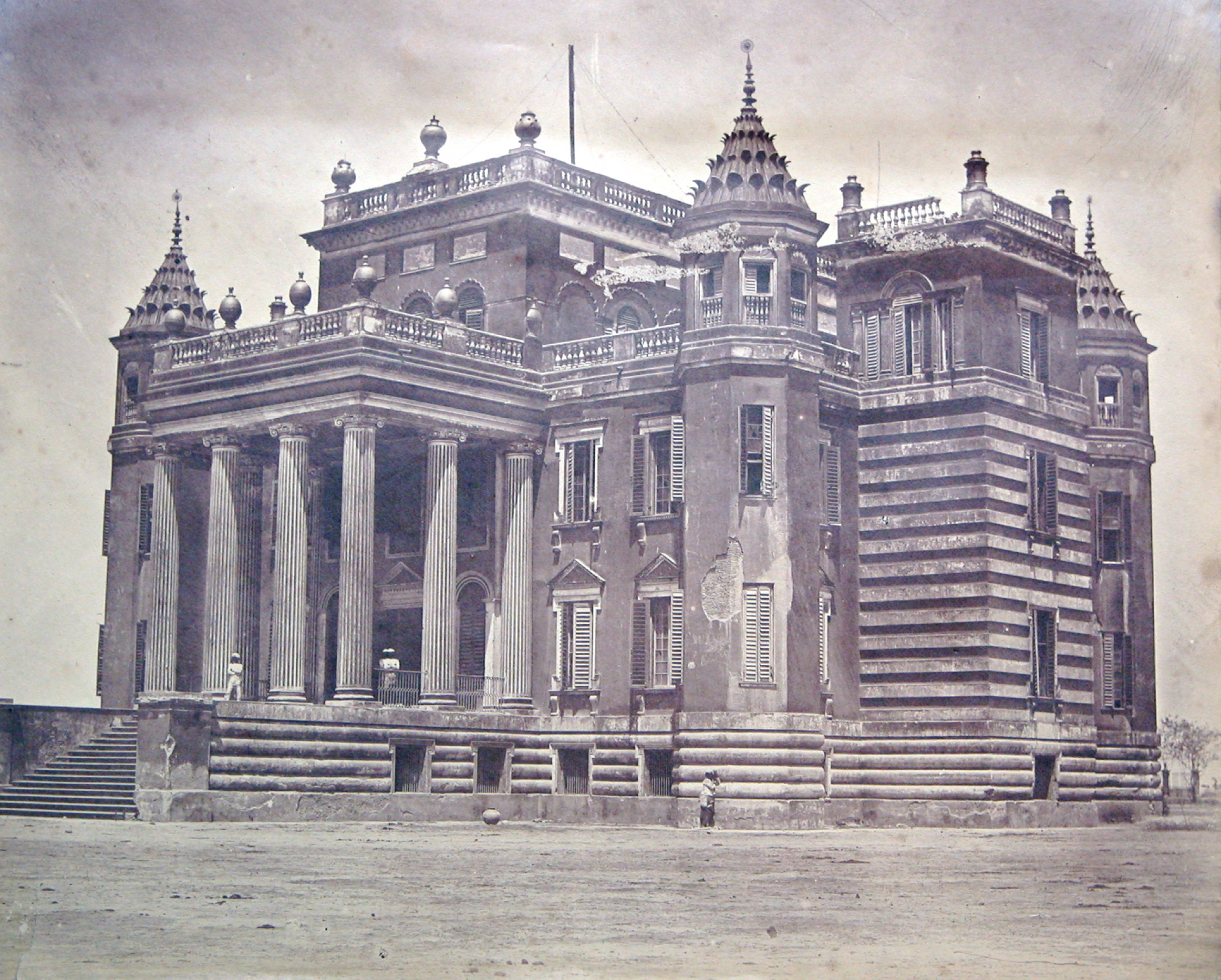
- Dilkusha Kothi in 1858 pictured by Francis Beato
- Interactive map of the Dilkusha Kothi area

General information
- Architectural style: English Baroque
- Location: Lucknow, India
- Construction started: c 1800
- Completed: c.1805
- Demolished: ruin by 1880s
- Client: Saadat Ali Khan

Dilkusha Kothi is the remains of an eighteenth-century house built in the English baroque style in the quiet Dilkusha area of Lucknow in India. Today there are only a few towers and external walls as a monument, though the extensive gardens remain. The house was shelled during its involvement in the Siege of Lucknow in 1857, together with the Residency and the nearby school of La Martinière.

== History ==
The house was constructed around 1800 by the British resident Major Gore Ouseley, a friend of the ruler of Oudh, Nawab Saadat Ali Khan. It was initially intended as a hunting lodge for the Nawabs of Oudh, although it was later used as a summer resort too. Changes were made to its design by Nawab, King Nasir-ud-Din Haider (1827-1837). The building had patterned walls and unusually no inner courtyard as was traditional in Indian architecture. The building therefore had a smaller footprint and did not extend over a large area but was taller than traditional local architecture. Like its neighbour, La Constantia, it is located on the banks of Lucknow's main river, the Gomti.

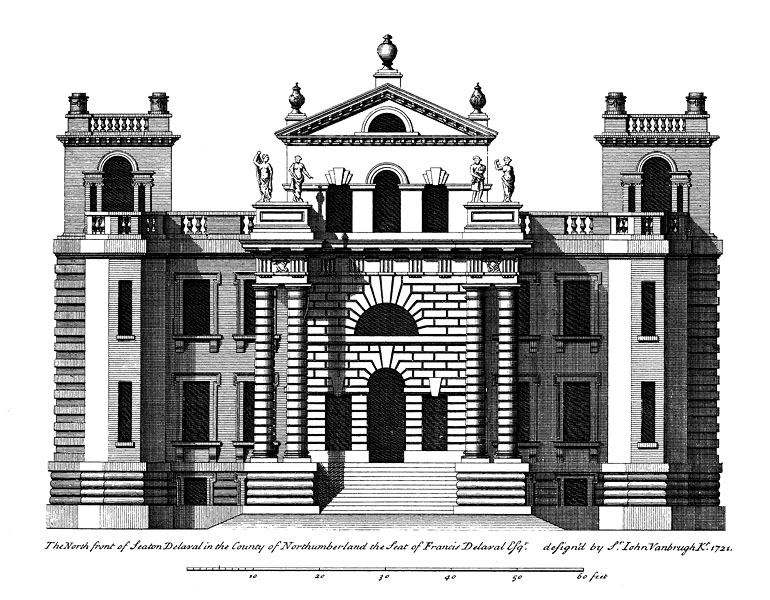
An engraving of the north front of Seaton Delaval Hall in Northumberland, England

The design bears a startling resemblance to the style of Seaton Delaval Hall in Northumberland, England. Seaton Delaval Hall was built in 1721 and was designed by Sir John Vanbrugh, who also designed Blenheim Palace. Dilkusha Kothi is depicted in a rare early albumen print by the photographer Samuel Bourne, dating from 1864–1865.

The British actress Mary Linley Taylor was impressed by Dilkusha Kothi and named her own home in Seoul after it. She explained, "From that moment in India when first I saw Dilkusha, the Palace of Heart's Delight, I dreamed of this moment when I would bestow upon our home the name 'Dilkusha'."

== Balloon ascent ==
It is said that in 1830, Dilkushi Kothi was the location for an early balloon ascent by "an Englishman". This story is less notable given that the Frenchman Claude Martin who had been a neighbour when his palace of Constantia, later La Martinière Boys College, was started in the 1790s. He too had arranged a balloon ascent in Lucknow and he died before the demonstration here. The ascent in 1830 was watched by King Nasir-ud-Din Haider and a large number of his courtiers.

== 1857 ==
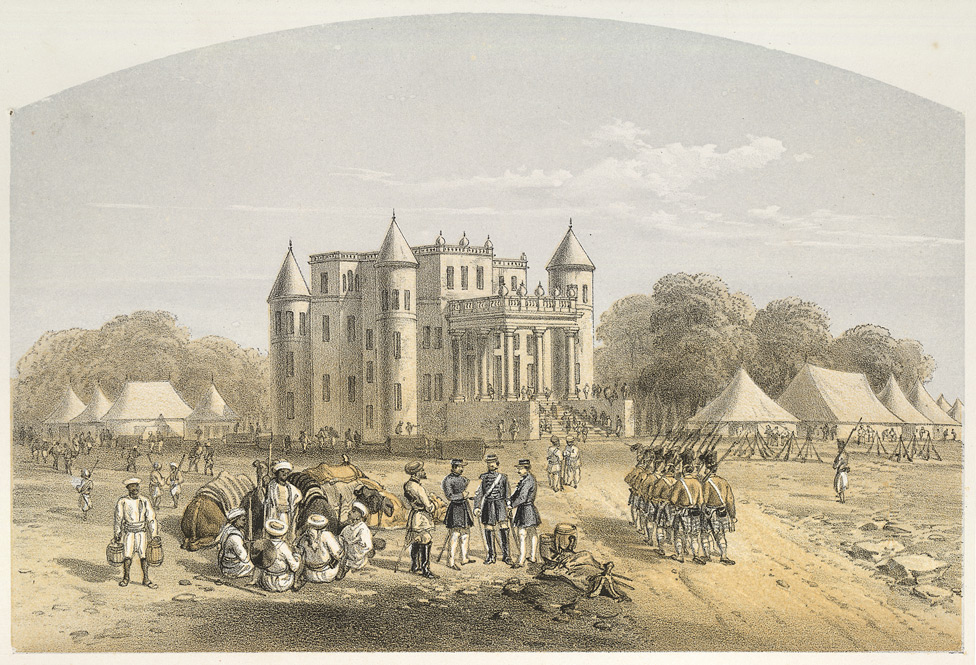
Plate 09, The Dil Khoosa Palace during the Siege of Lucknow in 1857

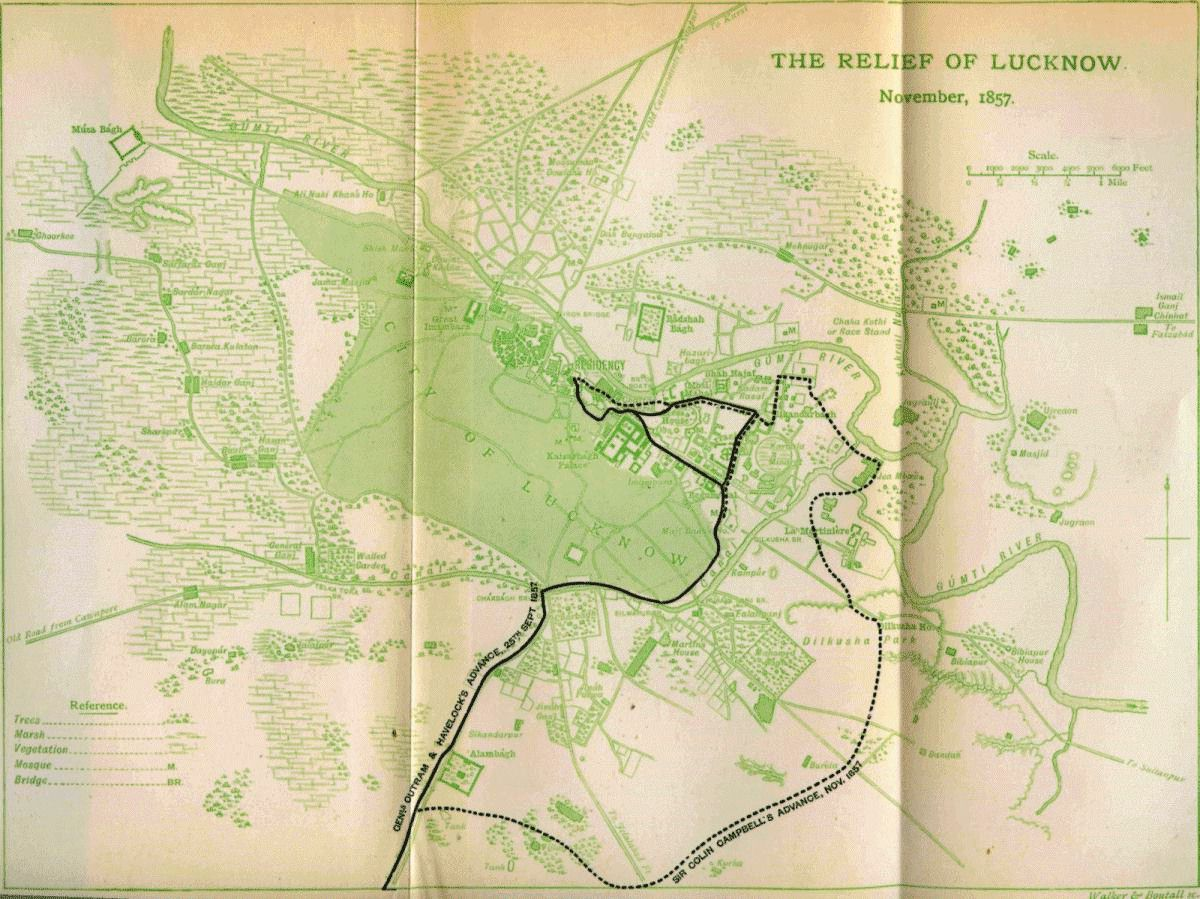
A map showing the British positions and the key positions of both Dilkusha Kothi and La Martinière College, towards the lower right.

The military positions in 1857 are shown on the map illustrated. The Dilkusha gardens are at the lower right near St Paul's College. In 1857 the house was occupied by Indian rebels before being recaptured by British forces under the instructions of Sir Colin Campbell. General Henry Havelock died on 24 November 1857 from dysentery at Dilkusha. The map illustrated shows how the grounds were at the centre of the British military activity in September and November 1857. Northwest along the river Gomti is La Martinière College, and further along the river is the Residency of Sir Henry Lawrence. These three buildings played a substantial role in the uprising in Lucknow. This building received heavy shelling, although the photograph above dated 1858 shows little evidence of major damage. A photo taken in 1898 shows the building in ruins , so it would appear that the major damage was not sustained in the siege.

Following the uprising a large number of medals were awarded, but the most valuable are said to be those that bear the words "Siege of Lucknow".

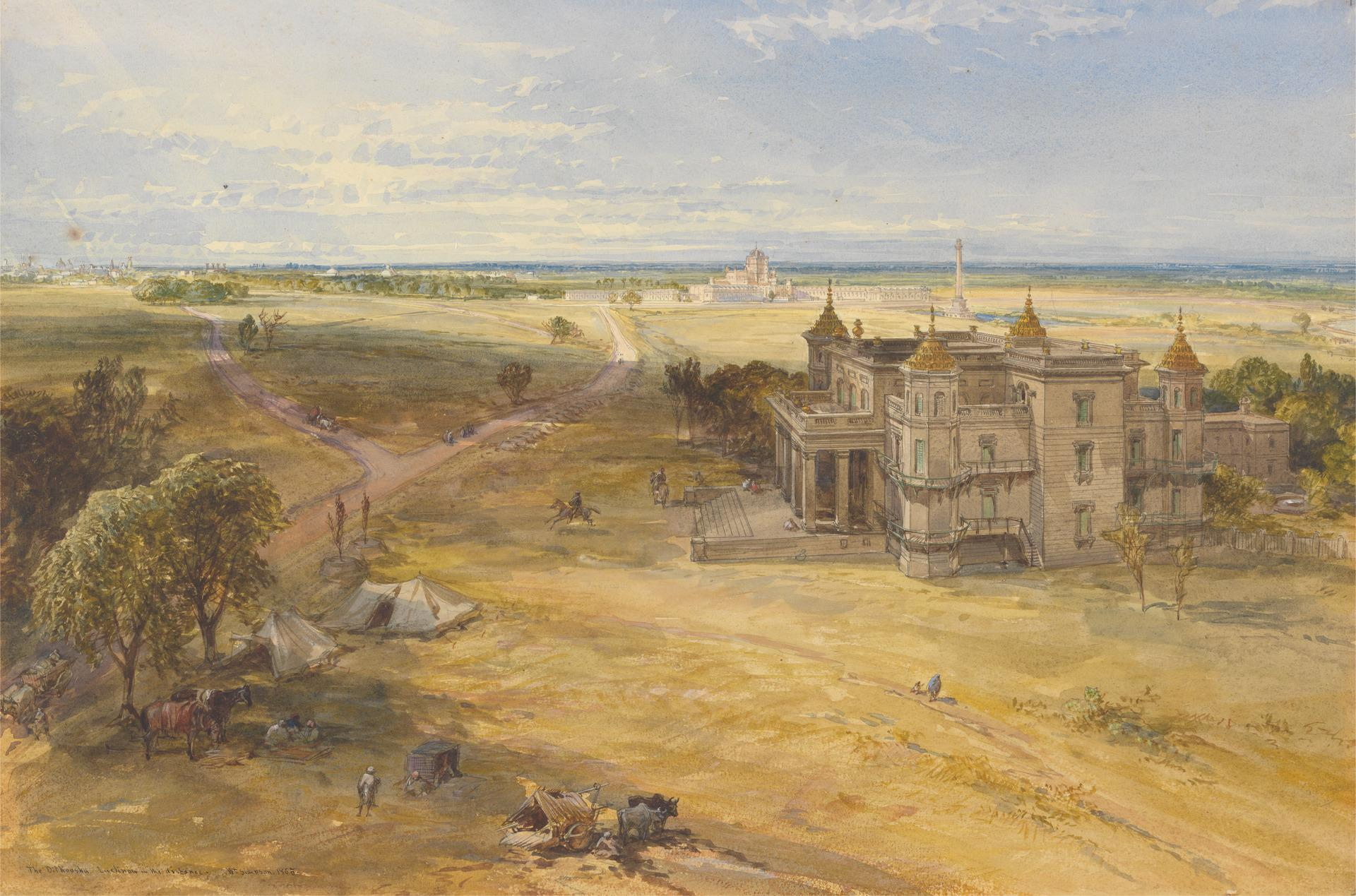
The Dilkusha with Lucknow in the Distance, 1866, William Simpson, Yale Center for British Art

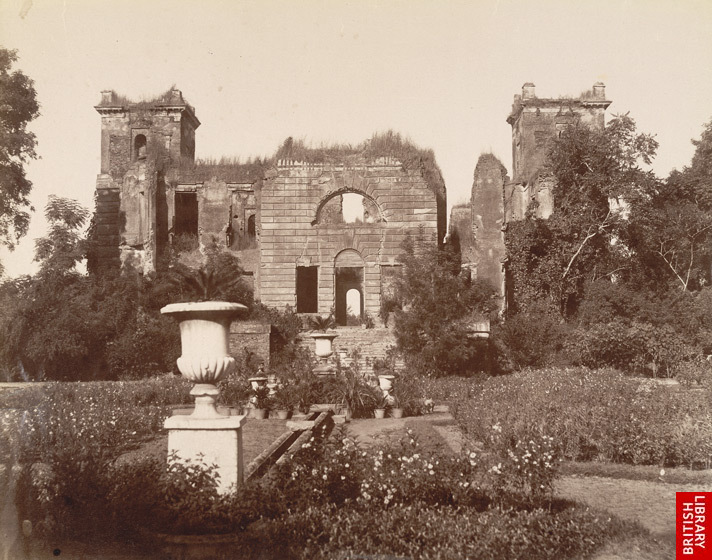
A picture taken in the 1880s by an unknown photographer shows the palace in ruins

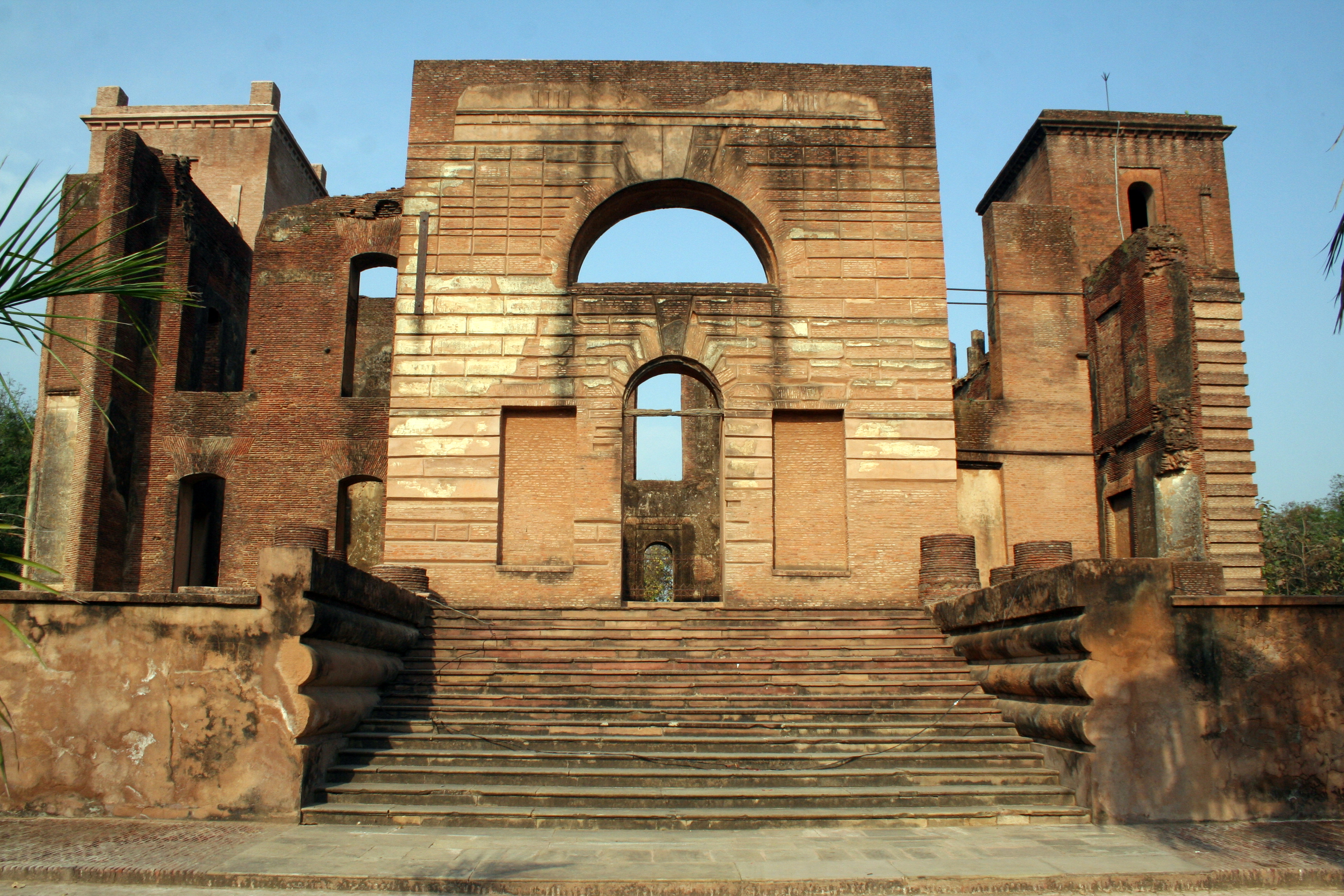
Recent photo of Dilkhusha Kothi

== Today ==
Today the gardens are visited by few people. It has been surmised that the reason may be the lack of publicity. There are a greater number of visitors during the winter when foreign tourists add to the normal visitors of families picnicking, school children and young couples. The Archaeological Society of India has done work to prevent further decay, carrying out gardening and small repairs. The site is considered to be deserving of further publicity by the ASI, subject to funding. It is claimed that "Dilkusha Kothi is probably one of the most beautiful monuments in the historic city of Lucknow."

== In literature ==
There are strong links to E. M. Forster's novel A Passage to India. In the book there is a place called Dilkusha, which is a replica of an English stately home.

== See also ==
- Dilkusha
- Lucknow
- Lucknow Siege
- La Martinière College, Lucknow
