= Mary Linley Taylor =

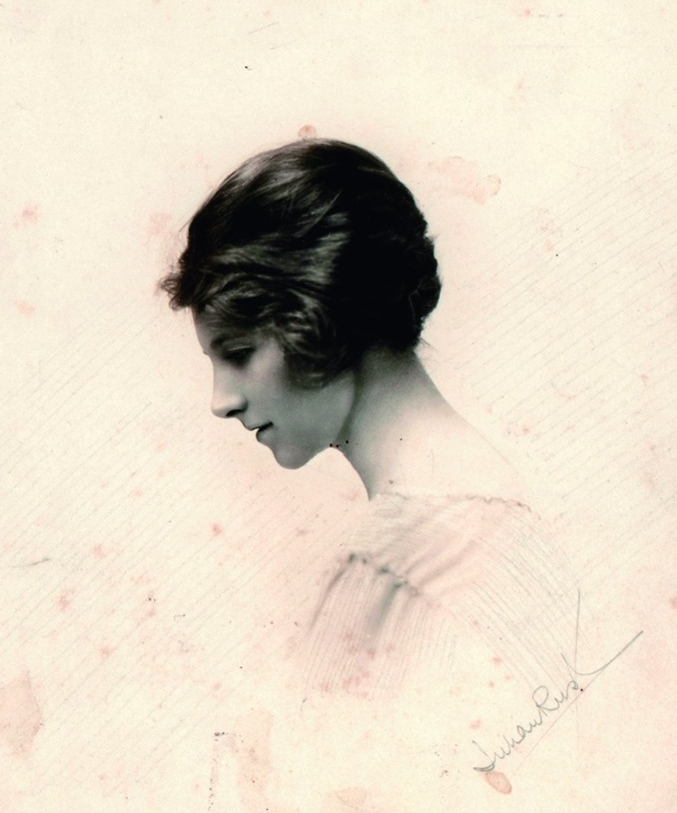
- Born: September 14, 1889; Malmesbury, England
- Died: 1982 (age 93)
- Occupation: stage actress
- Spouse: Albert Wilder Taylor

Mary Linley Taylor (1889–1982) born Hilda Mouat Biggs, was an English stage actress, who spent most of her adult life in Korea.

== Background ==
Marly Linley Taylor was born on September 14, 1889, in Abbey Row, Westport, Malmesbury, to Dr. Charles Edward Forbes Mouat-Biggs and Mary Louisa Tickell. She had two sisters, Betty and Una. Betty was also an actress. Taylor married Albert Wilder "Bruce" Taylor on June 15, 1917, at St. Thomas Cathedral in Bombay, India. Their son, Bruce Tickell Taylor (1919-2015), was born in Seoul and was granted honorary citizenship by then-mayor Lee Myung-bak.

== Married life in Korea ==
Mary and Albert lived in Seoul in Dilkusha, a house built in 1923 but from which they were forcibly evicted in 1942 by Japanese authorities. The house's name means 'Heart's Delight' in Urdu, and was inspired by the famous house of the same name, Dilkusha Kothi, in Lucknow, India, that the couple visited during their honeymoon. Mary was an active member of the Seoul Club, well known for her hospitality and dinner parties.

Albert, like his father and grandfather, was a successful gold miner. He was also a correspondent for United Press International. His connections, influence, and later refusal to leave Korea in 1941 led to him being deemed a criminal by the then-Japanese government, and he consequently spent six months in Seodaemun Prison. After returning to America the following year, he died in 1948. Mary returned to Korea to bury her husband next to his father's grave at Yanghwajin Foreigners' Cemetery. After her death, her autobiography Chain of Amber was published by her son, Bruce. Chain of Amber was translated into Korean in Seoul by Young-dahl Song in March, 2014.

== Selected bibliography ==
- 1956 The Tiger's Claw (a biography of George Yankovsky)
- 1992 Chain of Amber
- 2014 호박 목걸이(translation by Young-dahl Song)
