= Boatsteerer =

A boatsteerer was a position on a nineteenth-century whaleship. One of the most responsible members of the crew, a boatsteerer's duty was to pull the forward oar of a whaleboat until reaching within striking distance of a whale. He would then harpoon the whale with an iron while the boat-handler (mate) guided the boat.

== See also ==
- History of Whaling
