= History of Swedish =

In the 9th century, Old Norse began to diverge into Old West Norse (Norway and Iceland) and Old East Norse (Sweden and Denmark). In the 12th century, the dialects of Denmark and Sweden began to diverge, becoming Old Danish and Old Swedish in the 13th century. All were heavily influenced by Middle Low German during the medieval period. Though stages of language development are never as sharply delimited as implied here, and should not be taken too literally, the system of subdivisions used in this article is the most commonly used by Swedish linguists and is used for the sake of practicality.

== Old Norse ==
The approximate extent of Old Norse and related languages in the early 10th century: Old West Norse dialect Old East Norse dialect Old Gutnish dialect Old English Crimean Gothic Other Germanic languages with which Old Norse still retained some mutual intelligibility

In the 8th century, the common Germanic language of Scandinavia, Proto-Norse, had undergone some changes and evolved into Old Norse. This language began to undergo new changes that did not spread to all of Scandinavia, which resulted the appearance of two similar dialects, Old West Norse (Norway and Iceland) and Old East Norse (Denmark and Sweden).

Old East Norse is in Sweden called Runic Swedish and in Denmark Runic Danish, but until the 12th century, the dialect was the same in the two countries. The dialects are called runic because the main body of text appears in the runic alphabet. Unlike Proto-Norse, which was written with the Elder Futhark alphabet, Old Norse was written with the Younger Futhark alphabet, which only had 16 letters. Due to the limited number of runes, some runes were used for a range of phonemes, such as the rune for the vowel u which was also used for the vowels o, ø and y, and the rune for i which was also used for e.

A change that separated Old East Norse (Runic Swedish/Danish) from Old West Norse was the change of the diphthong æi (Old West Norse ei) to the monophthong e, as in stæin to sten. This is reflected in runic inscriptions where the older read stain and the later stin. There was also a change of au as in dauðr into ø as in døðr. This change is shown in runic inscriptions as a change from tauþr into tuþr. Moreover, the øy (Old West Norse ey) diphthong changed into ø as well, as in the Old Norse word for "island".

From 1100 onwards, the dialect of Denmark began to diverge from that of Sweden. The innovations spread unevenly from Denmark which created a series of minor dialectal boundaries, isoglosses, ranging from Zealand to Svealand.

== Old Swedish ==
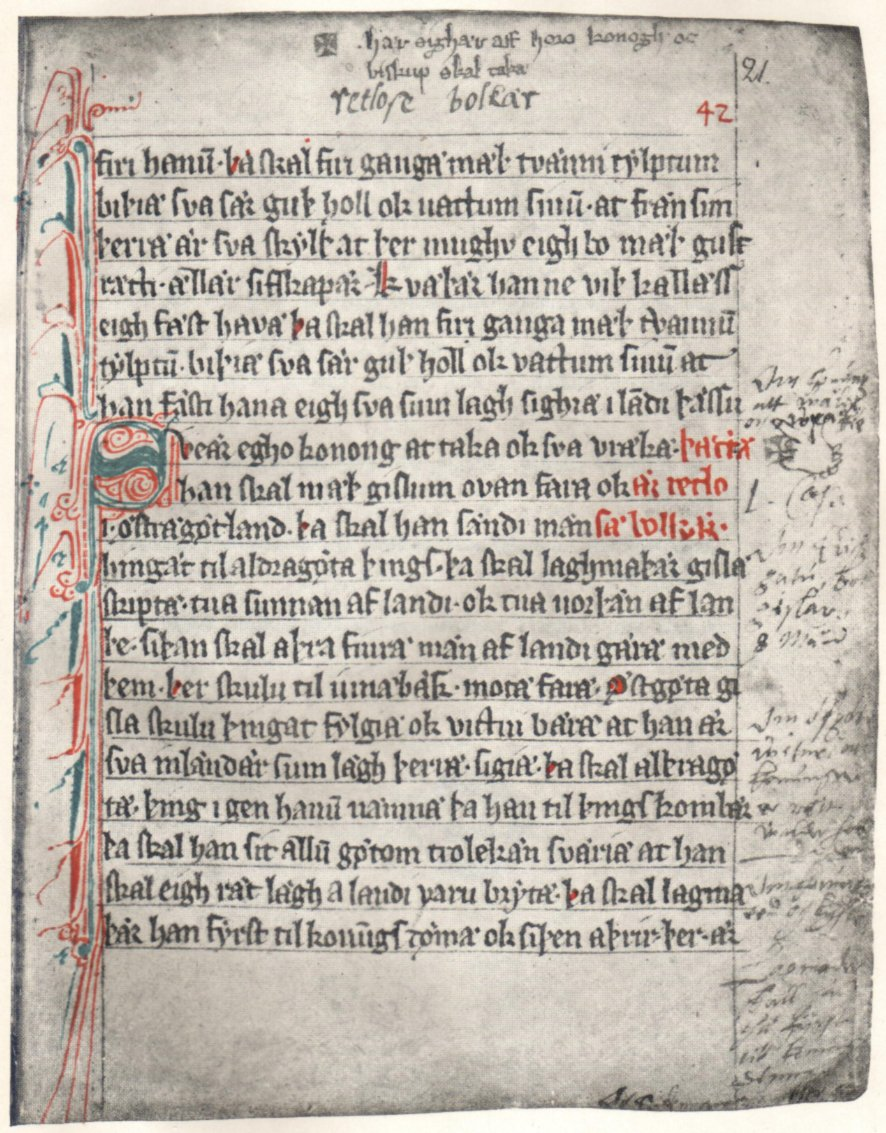
A copy of Äldre Västgötalagen – a law code of Västergötland from the 1280s, one of the earliest texts in Swedish written in the Latin alphabet.

Old Swedish is the term used for the medieval Swedish language, starting in 1225. Among the most important documents of the period written in Latin script is the oldest of the provincial law codes, Västgötalagen, of which fragments dated to 1250 have been found. The main influences during this time came with the firm establishment of the Catholic Church and various monastic orders, introducing many Greek and Latin loanwords. With the rise of Hanseatic power in the late 13th and early 14th century, the influence of Middle Low German became ever more present. The Hanseatic league provided Swedish commerce and administration with a large number of Low German speaking immigrants. Many became quite influential members of Swedish medieval society, and brought terms from their mother tongue into the vocabulary. Besides a great number of loan words for areas like warfare, trade and administration, general grammatical suffixes and even conjunctions where imported. Almost all of the naval terms were also borrowed from Dutch.

Early medieval Swedish was markedly different from the modern language in that it had a more complex case structure and had not yet experienced a reduction of the gender system. Nouns, adjectives, pronouns and certain numerals were inflected in four cases; besides the modern nominative and genitive there were also dative and accusative. The gender system resembled that of modern German, having the genders masculine, feminine and neuter. Most of the masculine and feminine nouns were later grouped together into a common gender. The verb system was also more complex: it included subjunctive and imperative moods and verbs were conjugated according to person as well as number. By the 16th century, the case and gender systems of the colloquial spoken language and the profane literature had been largely reduced to the two cases and two genders of modern Swedish. The old inflections remained common in high prose style until the 18th century, and in some dialects into the early 20th century.

A transitional change of the Latin script in the Nordic countries was to spell the letter combination "ae" as æ – and sometimes as a' – though it varied between individuals and regions. The combination "aa" similarly became a^{a}, and "oe" became o^{e}. These three were later to evolve into the separate letters ä, å and ö.

== Modern Swedish ==
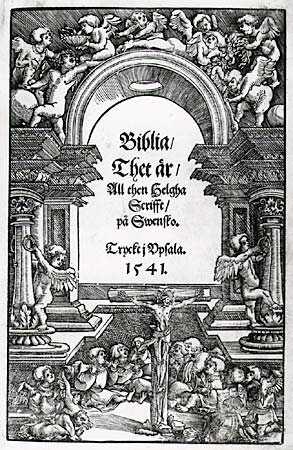
Front page of the Gustav Vasa Bible of 1541. The title translated to English reads: "The Bible / That is / The Holy Scripture / in Swedish. Printed in Uppsala. 1541".

Modern Swedish begins with the advent of the printing press and the European Reformation. After assuming power, the new monarch Gustav Vasa ordered a Swedish translation of the Bible. The New Testament came out in 1526, followed by a full Bible translation in 1541, usually referred to as the Gustav Vasa Bible, a translation deemed so successful and influential that, with revisions incorporated in successive editions, it remained the most common Bible translation until 1917. The main translators were Laurentius Andreæ and the brothers Laurentius and Olaus Petri.

The Vasa the holy Bible is often considered to be a reasonable compromise between old and new; while not adhering to the colloquial spoken language of its day it was not overly conservative in its use of archaic forms. It was a major step towards a more consistent Swedish orthography. It established the use of the vowels "å", "ä", and "ö", and the spelling "ck" in place of "kk", distinguishing it clearly from the Danish Bible, perhaps intentionally due to the ongoing rivalry between the countries. All three translators came from central Sweden which is generally seen as adding specific Central Swedish features to the new Bible.

Though it might seem as if the Bible translation set a very powerful precedent for orthographic standards, spelling actually became more inconsistent during the remainder of the century. It was not until the 17th century that spelling began to be discussed, around the time when the first grammars were written. The spelling debate raged on until the early 19th century, and it was not until the latter half of the 19th century that the orthography reached generally acknowledged standards.

Capitalization was during this time not standardized. It depended on the authors and their background. Those influenced by German capitalized all nouns, while others capitalized more sparsely. It is also not always apparent which letters are capitalized, due to the Gothic or black letter font which was used to print the Bible. This font was in use until the mid-18th century, when it was gradually replaced with a Latin font (often antiqua).

Some important changes in sound during the Modern Swedish period were the gradual assimilation of several different consonant clusters into /ɧ/ and the softening of /g/ and /k/ into /ʝ/ and /ɕ/ before front vowels. The dental and velar fricatives /ð/ and /ɣ/ were transformed to the corresponding plosives /d/ and /g/.

== Contemporary Swedish ==
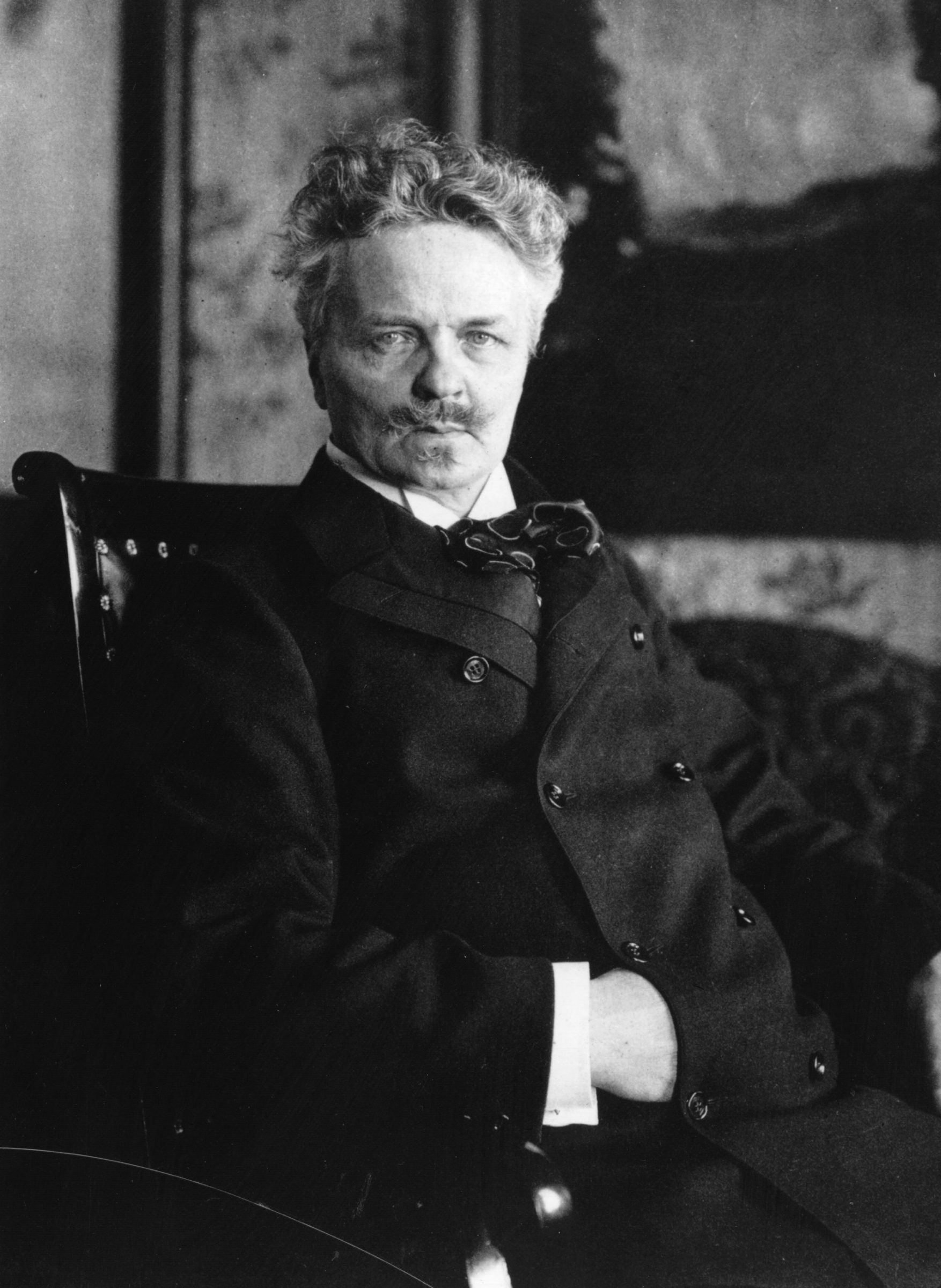
August Strindberg, often considered to be the founder of modern Swedish literature.

The period that includes Swedish as it is spoken today is termed nusvenska ("Contemporary Swedish", lit. "Now-Swedish") in linguistic terminology. With the industrialization and urbanization of Sweden well under way by the last decades of the 19th century, a new breed of authors made their mark on Swedish literature. Many authors, scholars, politicians and other public figures had a great influence on the new national language that was emerging, the most influential of these being August Strindberg (1849–1912).

It was during the 20th century that a common, standardized national language became available to all Swedes. The orthography was finally stabilized, and was almost completely uniform, with the exception of some minor deviations, by the time of the spelling reform of 1906. With the exception of plural forms of verbs and a slightly different syntax, particularly in the written language, the language was the same as the Swedish spoken today. The plural verb forms remained, in ever decreasing use, in formal (and particularly written) language until the 1950s, when they were finally officially abolished even from all official recommendations.

A very significant change in Swedish occurred in the 1960s, with the so-called du-reformen, "the you-reform". Previously, the proper way to address people of the same or higher social status had been by title and surname. The use of herr ("mr"), fru ("mrs") or fröken ("miss") was only considered acceptable in initial conversation with strangers of unknown occupation, academic title or military rank. The fact that the listener should preferably be referred to in the third person tended to further complicate spoken communication between members of society. In the early 20th century, an unsuccessful attempt was made to replace the insistence on titles with Ni (the standard second person plural pronoun) – corresponding to vous in French and Sie in German. Ni wound up being used as a slightly less arrogant form of du used to address people of lower social status. With the liberalization and radicalization of Swedish society in the 1950s and 60s, these previously significant distinctions of class became less important and du became the standard, even in formal and official contexts.

== Former language minorities ==
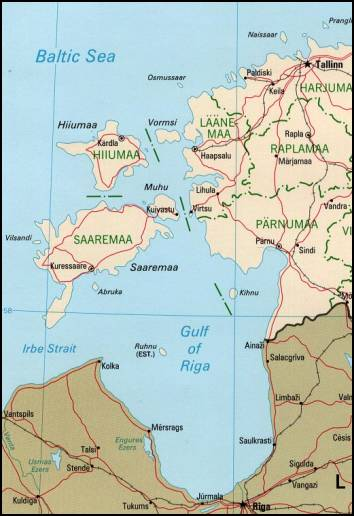
Map of the Estonian islands which formerly housed "Coastal Swede" populations

Formerly, there were Swedish-speaking communities in Estonia, particularly on the islands (Hiiumaa, Saaremaa and Vormsi) along the coast of the Baltic. The Swedish-speaking minority was represented in parliament, and entitled to use their native language in parliamentary debates. After the loss of the Baltic territories to Russia in the early 18th century, around 1,000 Swedish speakers were forced to march to Ukraine, where they founded a village, Gammalsvenskby ("Old Swedish Village"), north of the Crimea. A few elderly people in the village still speak Swedish and observe the holidays of the Swedish calendar, although the dialect is most likely facing extinction.

In Estonia, the small remaining Swedish community was very well treated between the First and Second World Wars. Municipalities with a Swedish majority, mainly found along the coast, had Swedish as the administrative language and Swedish-Estonian culture saw an upswing. However, most Swedish-speaking people fled to Sweden at the end of World War II when Estonia was incorporated into the Soviet Union. Only a handful of older speakers remain today.
