= Fridolf Jansson =

Swedish politician

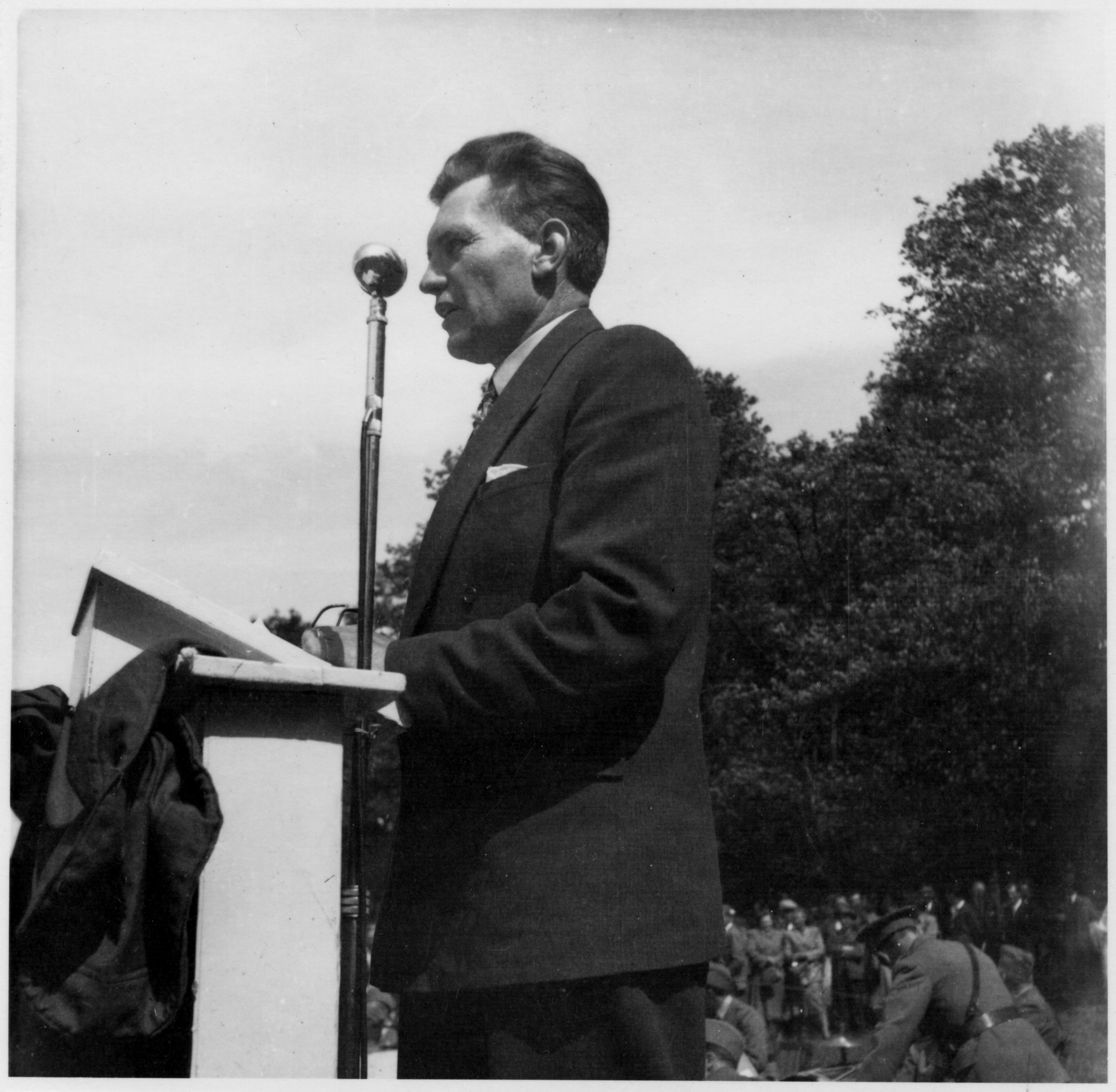
Fridolf Jansson in 1950

Fridolf Jansson (25 May 1904 – 7 June 1991) was a Swedish politician. He was a member of the Centre Party.
