= Bezverkhovo, Moscow Oblast =

Bezverkhovo Безверхово
- Dervenia
- Location within Moscow Oblast Location within Russia
- Coordinates: 56°6′43″N 37°14′53″E
- Country: Russia
- Region: Moscow Oblast
- District: Solnechnogorsky District

Population (2010)
  - Total: 8
- Time zone: UTC+3:00

Bezverkhovo (Russian: Безверхово) is a hamlet in Solnechnogorsky District of Moscow Oblast, Russia. Population: 8 (2010 census); 6 (2002 census); .
