= Guntis Jankovskis =

Latvian chess player

Personal information
- Born: 21 January 1971 (age 55)

Chess career
- Country: Latvia
- Title: FIDE Master (2019)
- Peak rating: 2378 (January 2003)

Guntis Jankovskis (born 21 January 1971) is a Latvian chess player, FIDE Master (2019), Latvian Chess Championship winner (2024).

== Chess career ==
Guntis Jankovskis started playing chess in 1980, was a student of Jēkabpils chess coach Jānis Mileika (1936–2010). He successfully played in youth and junior chess tournaments. In 1987, he won 2nd place in the Latvian Youth Chess Championship. In August 1988, in Dimitrovgrad, Guntis Jankovskis played for Latvian team and together with Alexei Shirov, Andrei Sokolov and others, he won team silver medal in the Soviet Youth Sports games.

Guntis Jankovskis is multiple participant of the Latvian Chess Championships, in which he often took places in the top ten. In 2021 he won Latvian Chess Championship bronze medal, and in 2024 he won gold medal. Also Guntis Jankovskis participated in various teams in the Latvian Team Chess Championships. In 1989, with Daugavpils chess club team, he won 2nd place in the team competition and was the best at his individual table. Three times with Olaine chess club he won 3rd place in this tournament (2014, 2016, 2018).

In 1996, he won a chess tournament Liepājas Rokāde.

Guntis Jankovskis also regularly participated in his coach Jānis Mileika's Memorial tournaments, in which he won 2nd place (2017) and 3rd place (2011).

In 2019, he became a FIDE chess master. He works as a chess coach of Jēkabpils Sports School.
