= Mikhail Shevelev =

Russian shipping entrepreneur and sinologist

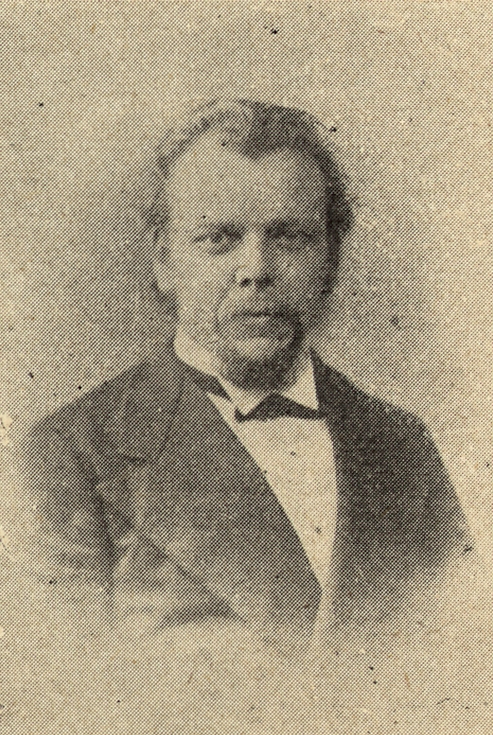

Mikhail Grigoryevich Shevelev (Russian: Михаил Григорьевич Шевелёв; 25 August 1844 – 8 November 1903) was a Russian Empire businessman, tea-trader, founder of the Russia Empire's first shipping company and a Sinologist who lived and worked in the Vladivostok region.

== Biography ==
Shevelev was born in a family of merchants in Verkhneudinsk (now Ulan-Ude). He took an interest in science and was also an expert in Chinese after graduating from a school of translators (founded by N.Y. Bichurin) in Kyakhta in 1861. With his language abilities, he was appointed as a translator to the Russian Orthodox mission to China. While living in Hankou, he began to set up a tea trading company called Oborin, Tokmakov and Co, which became in 1874 Tokmakov, Shevelev and Co. By 1880 they were among the largest Russian tea traders in the east. In 1879, he established the Russian Shipping Company in Vladivostok, plying ships between Vladivostok- Nikolayevsk-on-Amur initially and Vladivostok-Shanghai-Hankou around 1881. The operations ended in 1883 possibly due to increasing British influence in tea export.

Shevelev also took an interest in Chinese culture and history, accumulating a large collection of Chinese literature. He became one of the trustees of the Oriental Institute in Vladivostok. He died from a heart attack and was buried in Vladivostok. A daughter, Margarita, married the famous Russian tiger hunter George Yankovsky.
