= Bezverkhovo, Primorsky Krai =

Bezverkhovo Безверхово
- Selo
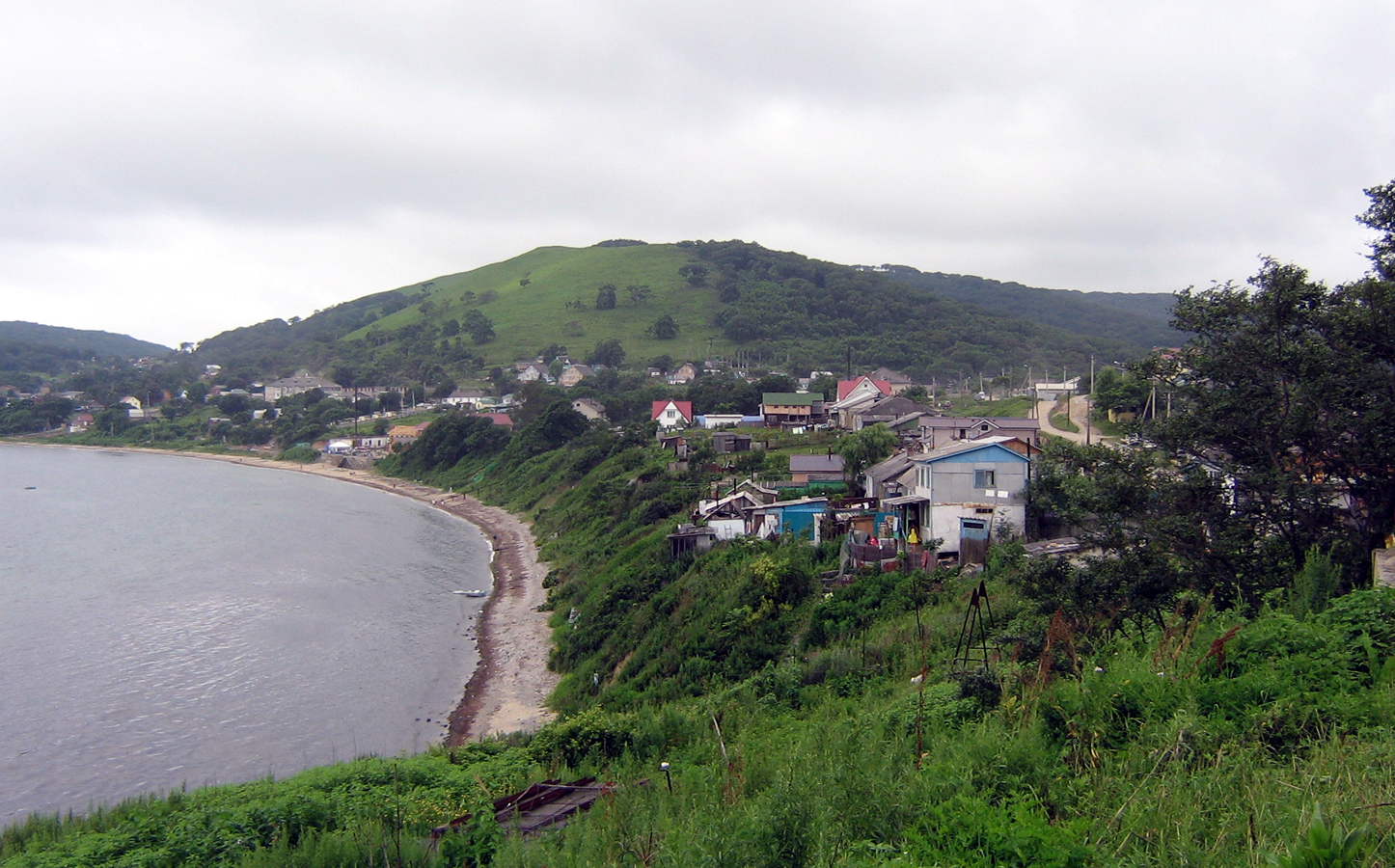

- Location within Primorsky Krai Location within Russia
- Coordinates: 42°58′18″N 131°29′15″E
- Country: Russia
- Region: Primorsky Krai
- District: Khasansky District

Population (2010)
  - Total: 889
- Time zone: UTC+10:00

Bezverkhovo (Russian: Безверхово) is a village, the administrative center of the Bezverkhovskoye Rural Settlement, part of the Khasansky District of Primorsky Krai, Russia. Population: 889 (2010 census); 1,037 (2002 census); .
